= African swallow =

African swallow may refer to:

- Genus Cecropis, mud-nest building swallows:
  - Lesser striped swallow, Cecropis abyssinica
  - Greater striped swallow, Cecropis cucullata
  - Red-rumped swallow, Cecropis daurica (range extends beyond Africa)
  - West African swallow, Cecropis domicella
  - Red-breasted swallow, Cecropis semirufa
  - Mosque swallow, Cecropis senegalensis
- Genus Hirundo open-cup nesting swallows:
  - Ethiopian swallow, Hirundo aethiopica
  - White-throated swallow, Hirundo albigularis
  - Angola swallow, Hirundo angolensis
  - Blue swallow, Hirundo atrocaerulea
  - Pearl-breasted swallow, Hirundo dimidiata
  - Pied-winged swallow, Hirundo leucosoma
  - Red-chested swallow, Hirundo lucida
  - White-tailed swallow, Hirundo megaensis
  - white-bibbed swallow, Hirundo nigrita
  - Black-and-rufous swallow, Hirundo nigrorufa
  - Barn swallow, Hirundo rustica (range extends beyond Africa, this is also the European swallow)
  - Wire-tailed swallow, Hirundo smithii smithii
- Genus Petrochelidon, cliff nesting swallows:
  - Forest swallow, Petrochelidon fuliginosa
  - Preuss's cliff swallow, Petrochelidon preussi
  - Red-throated cliff swallow, Petrochelidon rufigula
  - South African cliff swallow, Petrochelidon spilodera
- Genus Pseudhirundo:
  - Grey-rumped swallow, Pseudhirundo griseopyga

== See also ==
- Swallow
- African swallowtail (Papilio dardanus)
- African Swallow-tailed Kite
