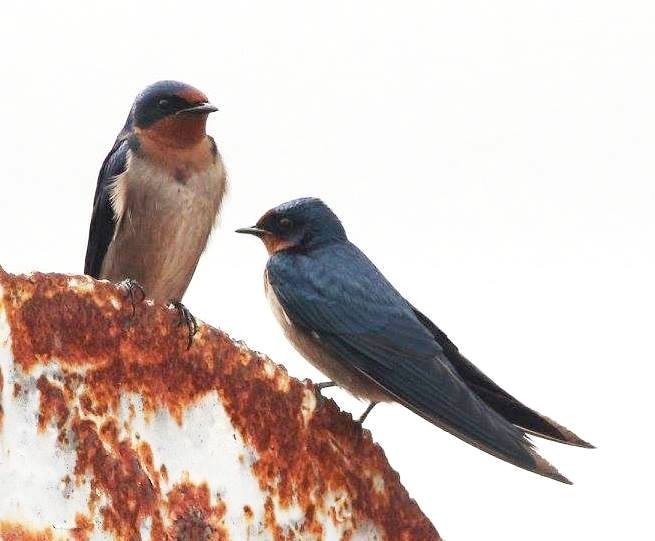
- At Munhango, Angola

Conservation status
- Least Concern (IUCN 3.1)

Scientific classification
- Kingdom: Animalia
- Phylum: Chordata
- Class: Aves
- Order: Passeriformes
- Family: Hirundinidae
- Genus: Hirundo
- Species: H. angolensis

Binomial name
- Hirundo angolensis Barboza du Bocage, 1868

= Angola swallow =

Species of bird

The Angola swallow (Hirundo angolensis) is a species of swallow that is native to the Afrotropics.

== Description ==
They measure 15 cm and weigh 16 to 19 g. The plumage of the forehead, throat and upper breast is coloured deep rufous-chestnut. The crown and upperparts are a shiny steel-blue. Flight and tail feathers are black, the latter with large white windows.

== Behaviour ==
They frequent a variety of open habitats up to the fringes of forest, whether altered by man or natural. Their diet consists of a variety of flying insects. They may forage alone or in flocks, and emit a weak twittering. Their breeding season and abundance depends much on their region of residence, and a few undertake migrations.

== Range ==
It is found in Angola, Burundi, Democratic Republic of the Congo, Gabon, Kenya, Malawi, Namibia, Rwanda, Tanzania, Uganda, and Zambia.

== Relationships ==
It has been considered conspecific with the Red-chested swallow, but is generally taken as a full species in a species complex that includes Barn, Red-chested, Pacific, Welcome, White-throated and Ethiopian swallows.

== Subspecies ==
There are two subspecies, but intermediate forms occur:

- H. a. angolensis – type from Huíla Province, Angola
- H. a. arcticincta Sharpe, 1891 – East Africa

== Gallery ==
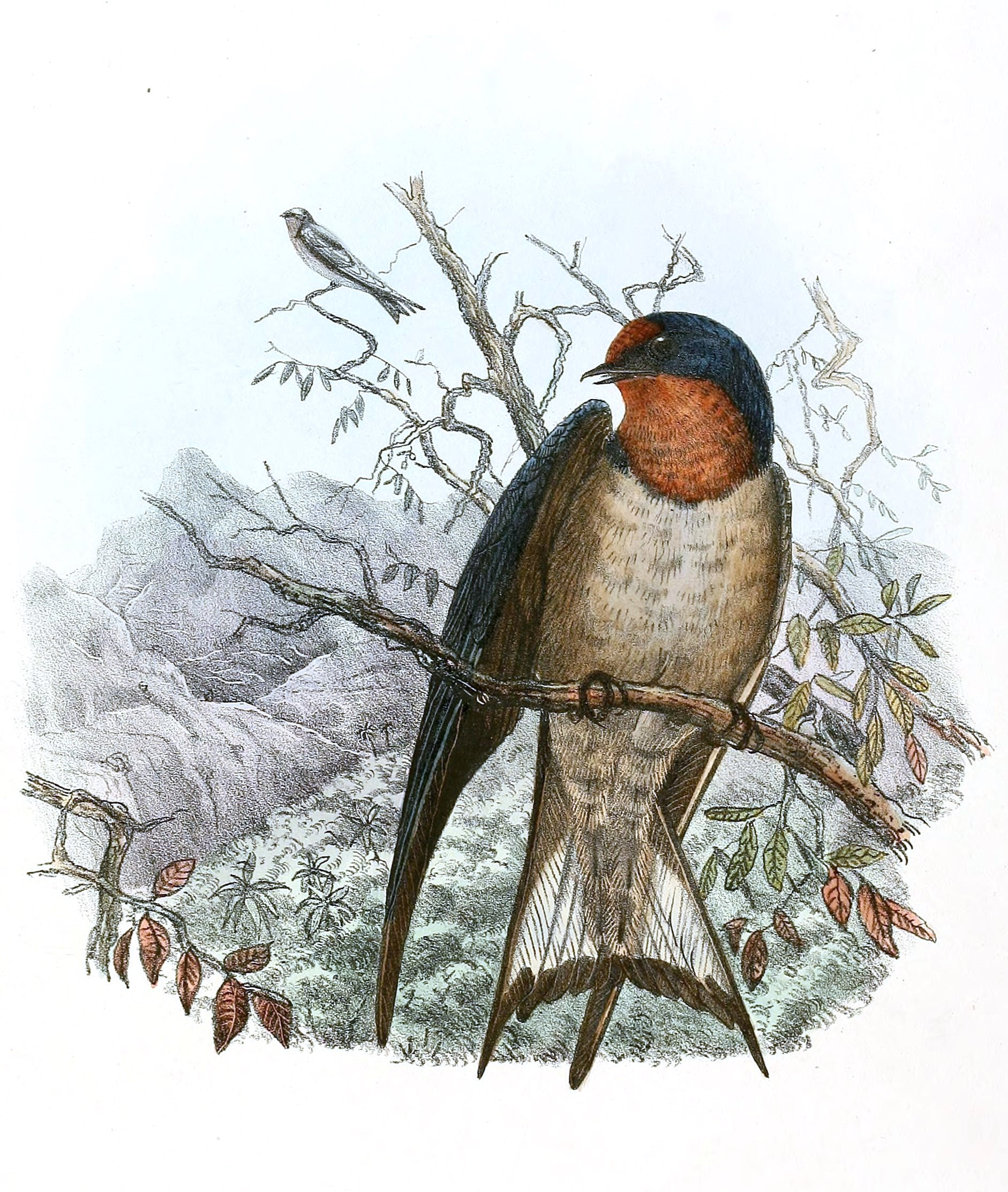
Nominate subsp. from illustration by R. B. Sharpe (1894)

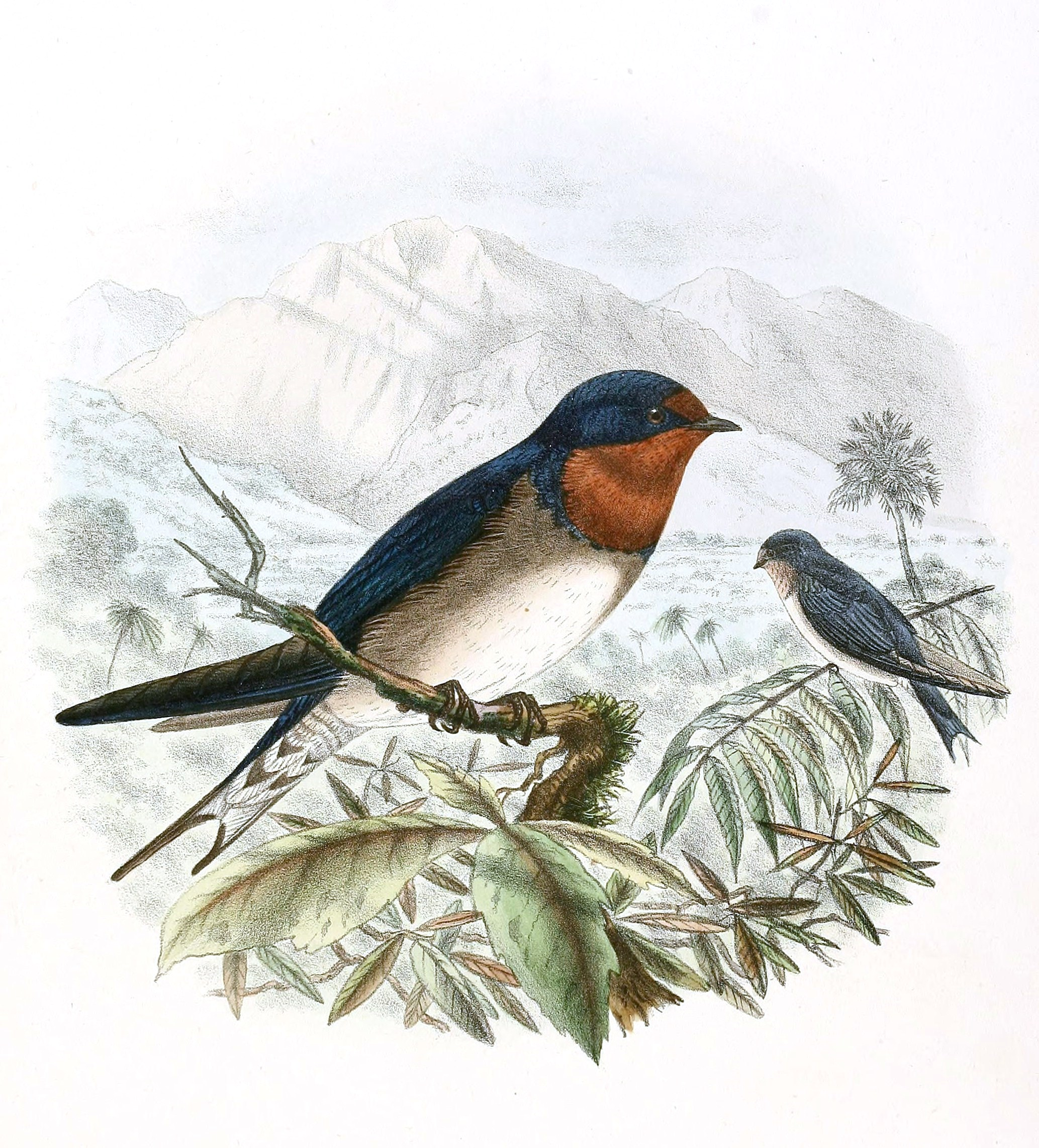
Subsp. arcticincta with deeper tail-fork & paler belly plumage

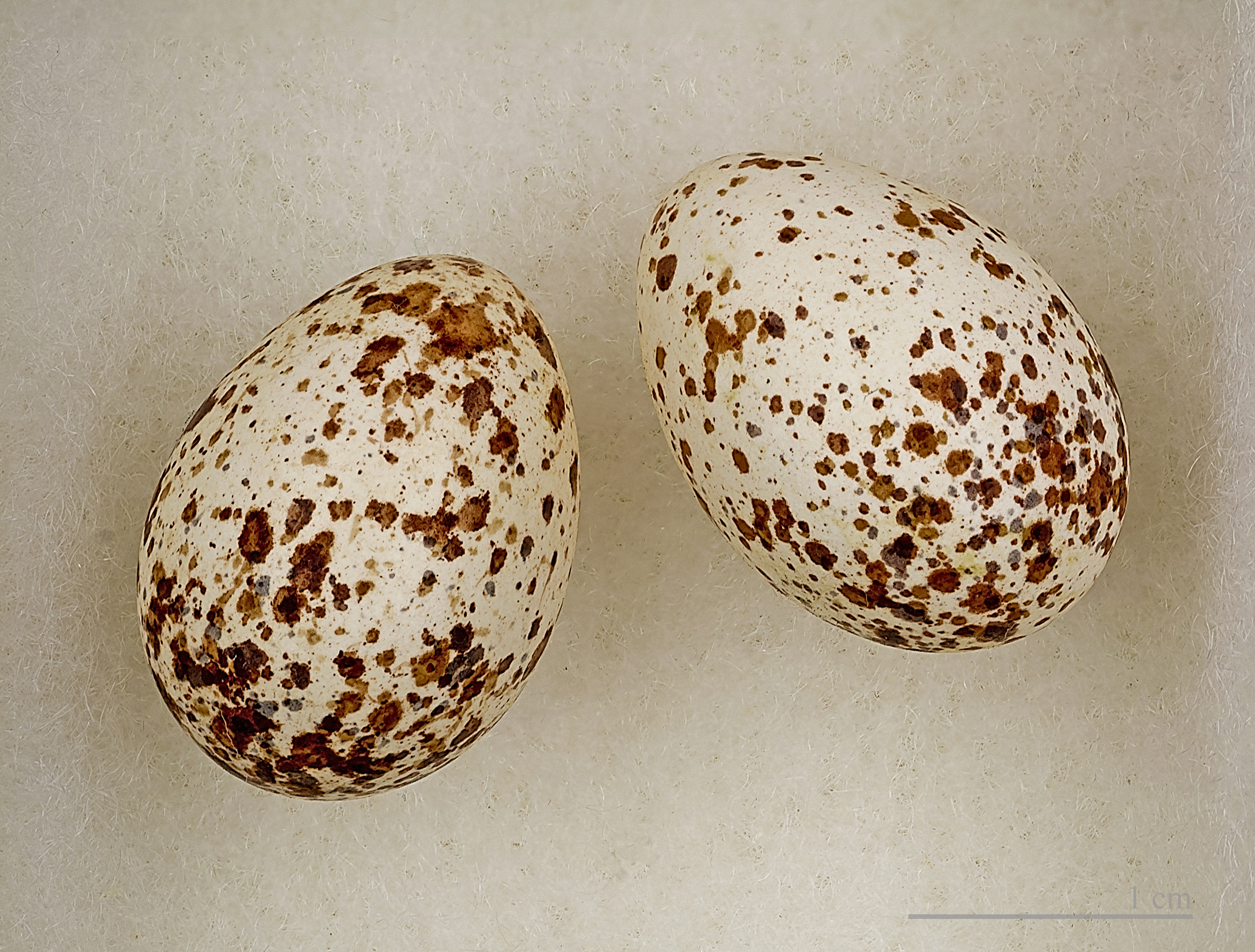
Egg of Angola swallow
