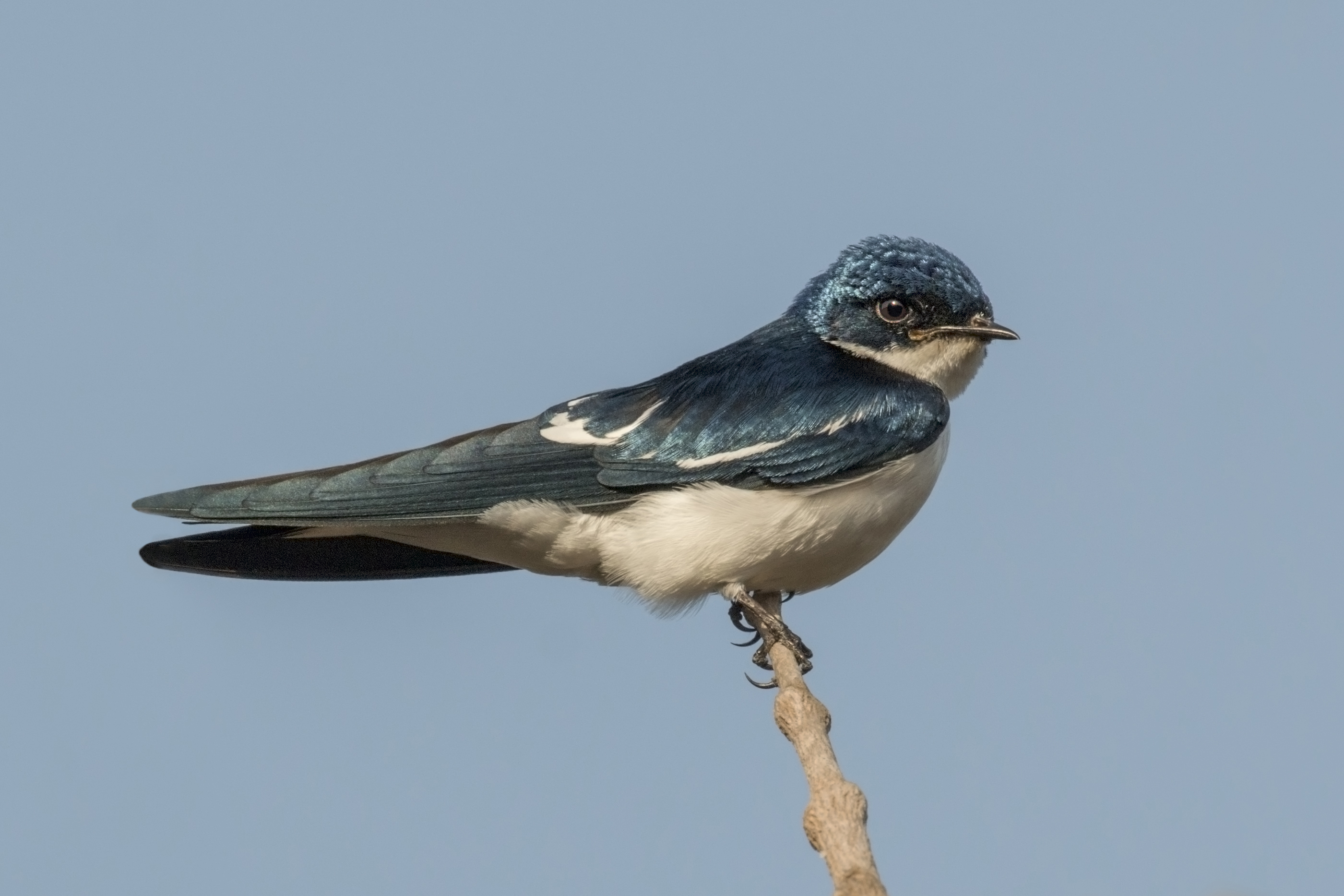
- In Gambia

Conservation status
- Least Concern (IUCN 3.1)

Scientific classification
- Kingdom: Animalia
- Phylum: Chordata
- Class: Aves
- Order: Passeriformes
- Family: Hirundinidae
- Genus: Hirundo
- Species: H. leucosoma

Binomial name
- Hirundo leucosoma Swainson, 1837
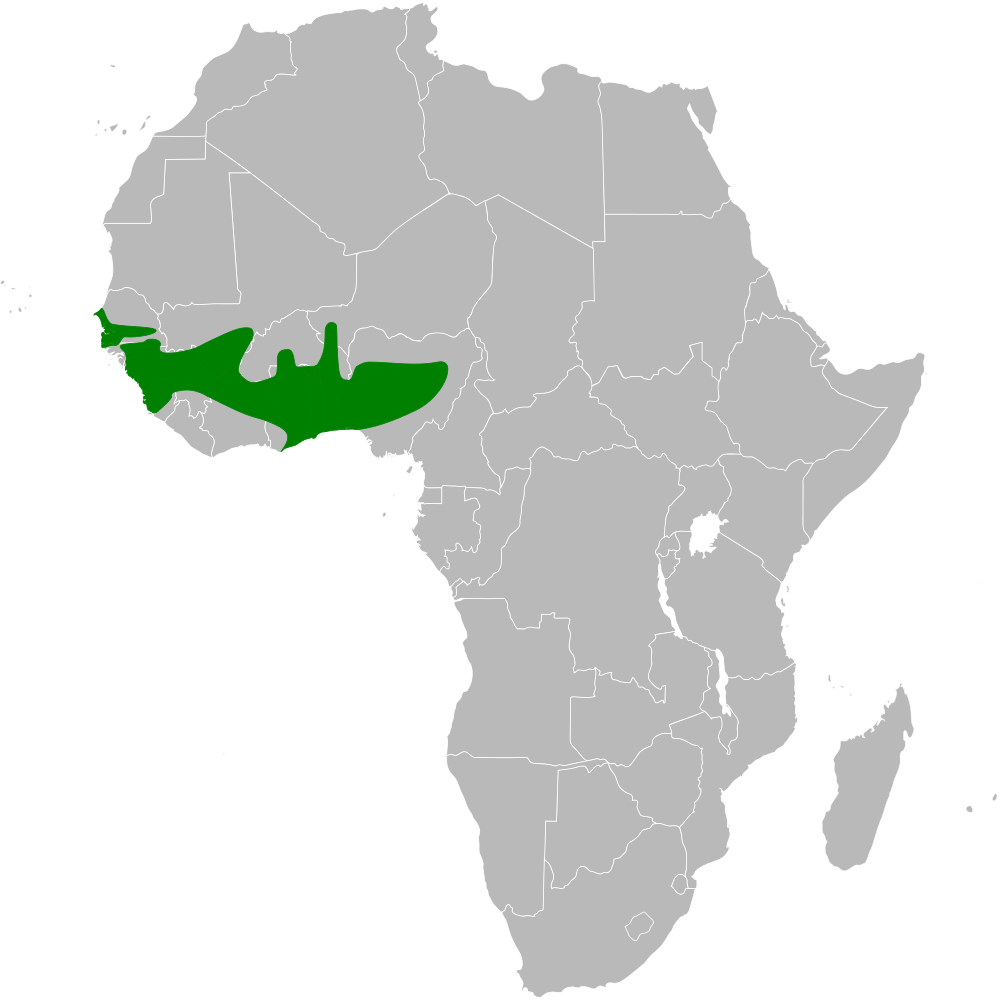

= Pied-winged swallow =

Species of bird in West Africa

The pied-winged swallow (Hirundo leucosoma) is a species of bird in the family Hirundinidae. It has distinctive steel-blue upperparts with white wing patches. It is native to parts of West Africa.

== Taxonomy ==
The pied-winged swallow was described by the English ornithologist William Swainson in 1837 who introduced its current binomial name Hirundo leucosoma. The specific epithet combines the Ancient Greek words leukos, "white" and sōma, sōmatos, "body". The species is monotypic. Evolutionarily, the pied-winged swallow occupies a basal position within the clade of Hirundo swallows and is most closely related to the pearl-breasted swallow (Hirundo dimidiata).

== Description ==
The pied-winged swallow is about 12 cm (4.7 in) long with glossy steel-blue wings and head. Most of the underside of the bird is white, with additional white patches found on special wing feathers. The tail is also steel-blue, but has green reflections. Females and juveniles typically have shorter tails. Juveniles are also typified by a browner head and generally duller colour overall. The outer tail feathers have white inner edges and an oval white spot. The eyes are brown, while beak and feet are both black. It is the only West African swallow with a wing patch. Wings average 9.9 cm (3.9 in).

The pied-winged's call is a short "chut", but in general they are not especially vocal birds. They use the "chut" as a contact call, but usually vocalize only when perched.

== Distribution and habitat ==
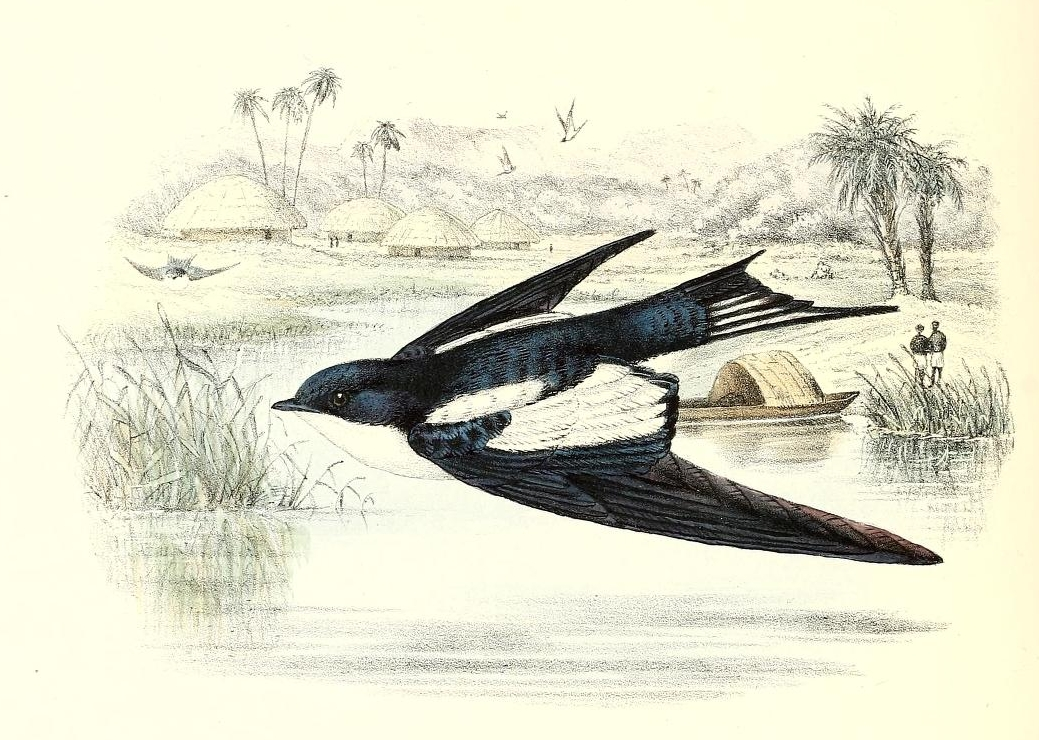
Wing pattern in flight

This swallow is found in Benin, Burkina Faso, Cameroon, Ivory Coast, Gambia, Ghana, Guinea, Guinea-Bissau, Mali, Niger, Nigeria, Senegal, Sierra Leone, and Togo. It lives in a variety of environments including wooded savannas, forest clearings and rivers. It is not shy and will live around humans and in towns. Buildings and other human habitations make for common nesting sites, and have potentially boosted the pied-winged's population.

Pied-winged swallows are partial migrants, travelling as far as Ghana and Northern Nigeria during the rainy season. During non-breeding periods they can be found in Senegal and Togo. They have been recorded as vagrants in western Cameroon.

== Behaviour ==
Breeding begins in April or May and runs through June. Shallow mud nests are built by both sexes and are lined with grass or any available fibres. Nest construction takes as long as a month, although nests are often reused year after year. Nests are sometimes located near those of the red-breasted swallow. Common locations include on buildings or under rafters, although one extreme nest was recorded as being located 4.6 m (15 ft) down a well. Clutches typically contain 4 pure white eggs, although clutches of 3 eggs are not uncommon. They measure 19.7 mm × 13.1 mm (0.78 in × 0.52 in) and weigh 1.77 g (0.062 oz).

Pied-wingeds are fast and agile fliers, making use of many banks and turns during flight. Much feeding is done in flight, which consists of various insects caught from the air. It is unknown whether certain species or types of insects are preferred in the diet. Feeding is usually done alone or in pairs over grassland, although they will sometimes congregate in larger groups or with other species of swallow. Pied-wingeds living near humans will often feed over lawns.
