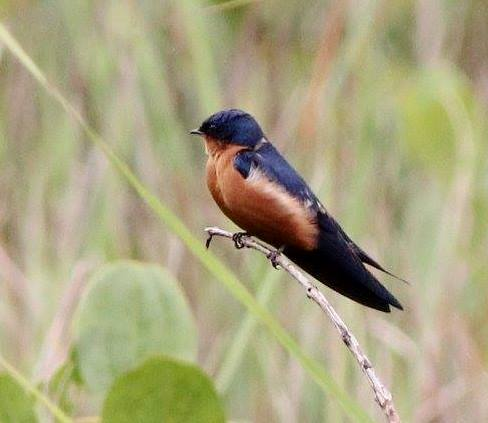
- At Munhango, Angola

Conservation status
- Least Concern (IUCN 3.1)

Scientific classification
- Kingdom: Animalia
- Phylum: Chordata
- Class: Aves
- Order: Passeriformes
- Family: Hirundinidae
- Genus: Hirundo
- Species: H. nigrorufa

Binomial name
- Hirundo nigrorufa Barboza du Bocage, 1877

= Black-and-rufous swallow =

Species of bird

The black-and-rufous swallow (Hirundo nigrorufa) is a species of bird in the family Hirundinidae.

== Range ==
It inhabits the miombo ecosystems of Angola, Democratic Republic of the Congo and Zambia.

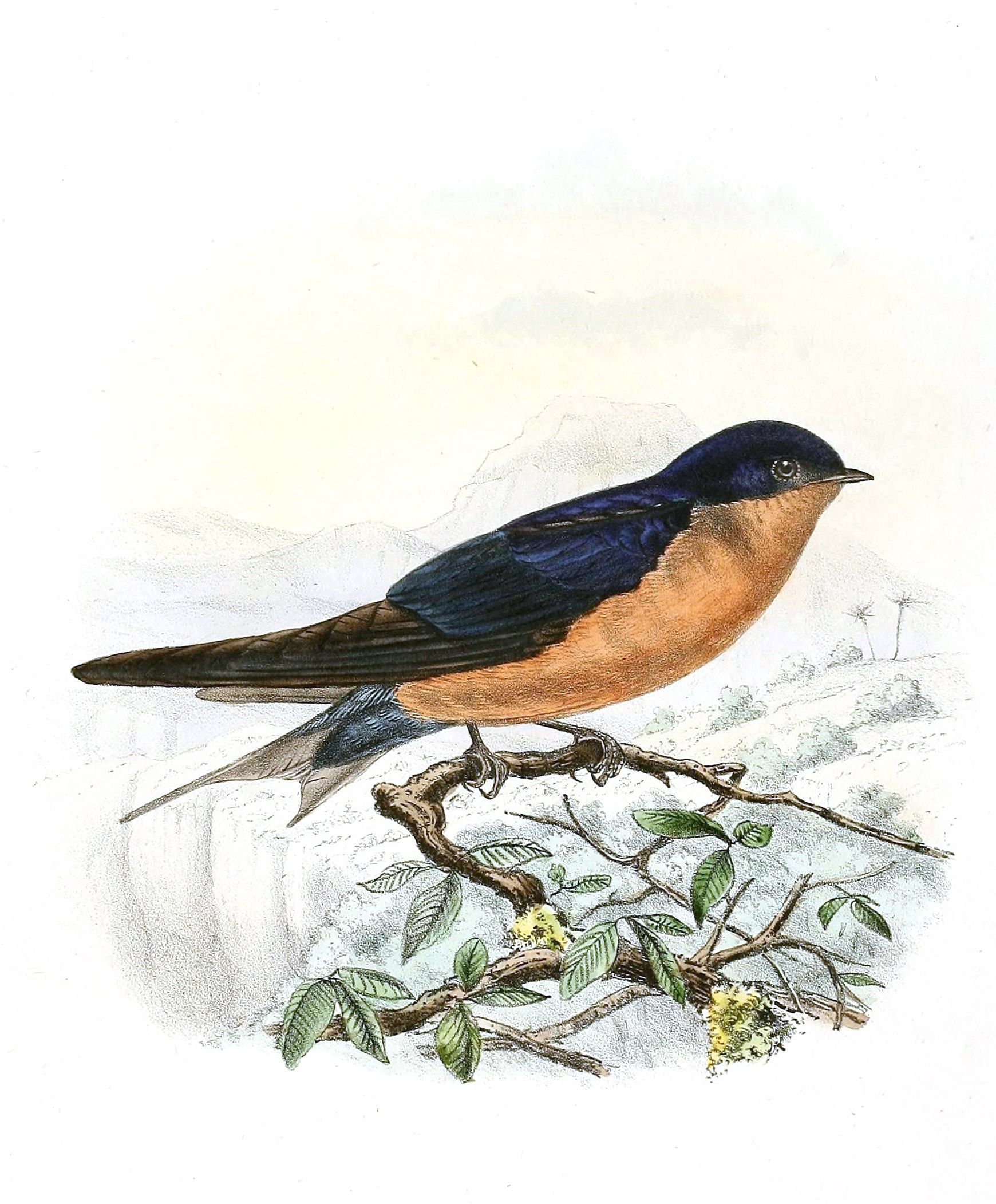
Illustration dating from 1894

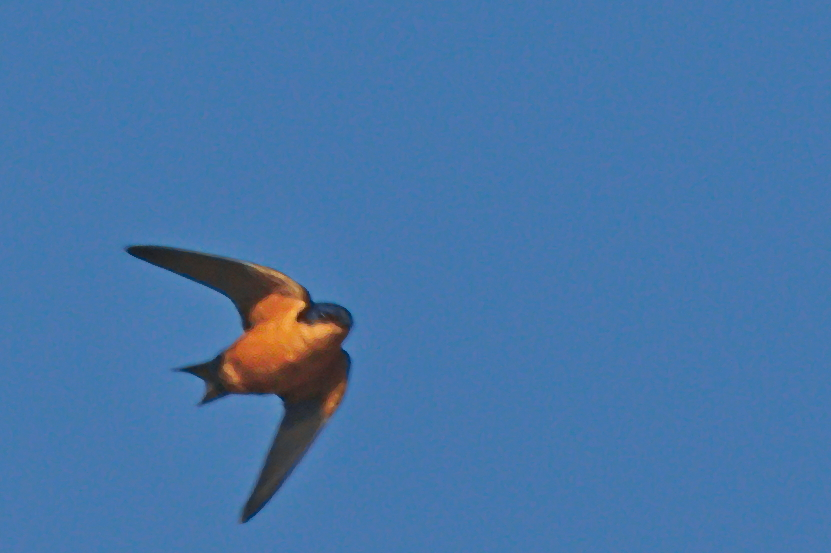
Black-and-rufous Swallow, flying
