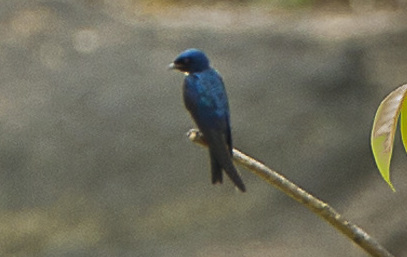

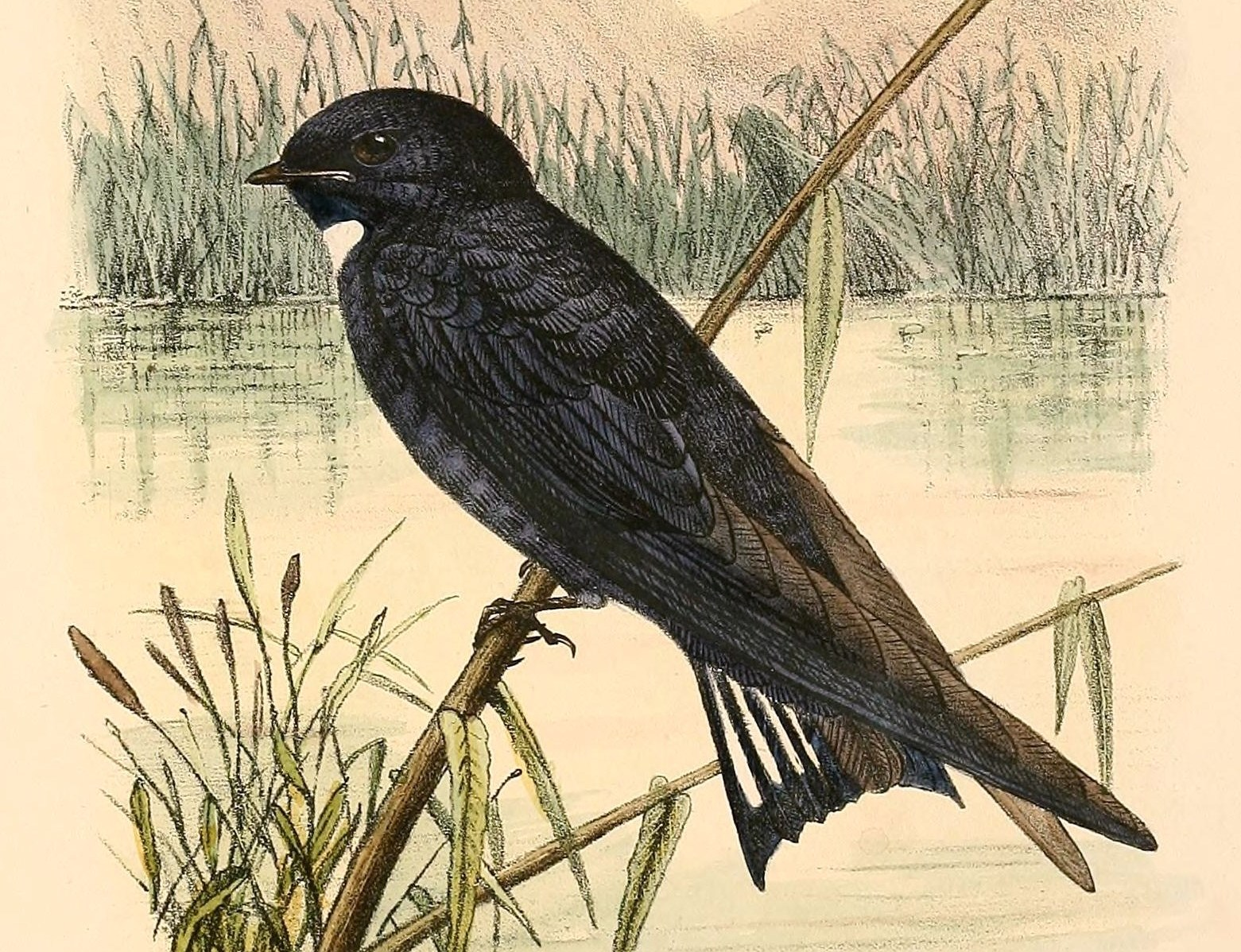

Conservation status
- Least Concern (IUCN 3.1)

Scientific classification
- Kingdom: Animalia
- Phylum: Chordata
- Class: Aves
- Order: Passeriformes
- Family: Hirundinidae
- Genus: Hirundo
- Species: H. nigrita

Binomial name
- Hirundo nigrita Gray, 1845
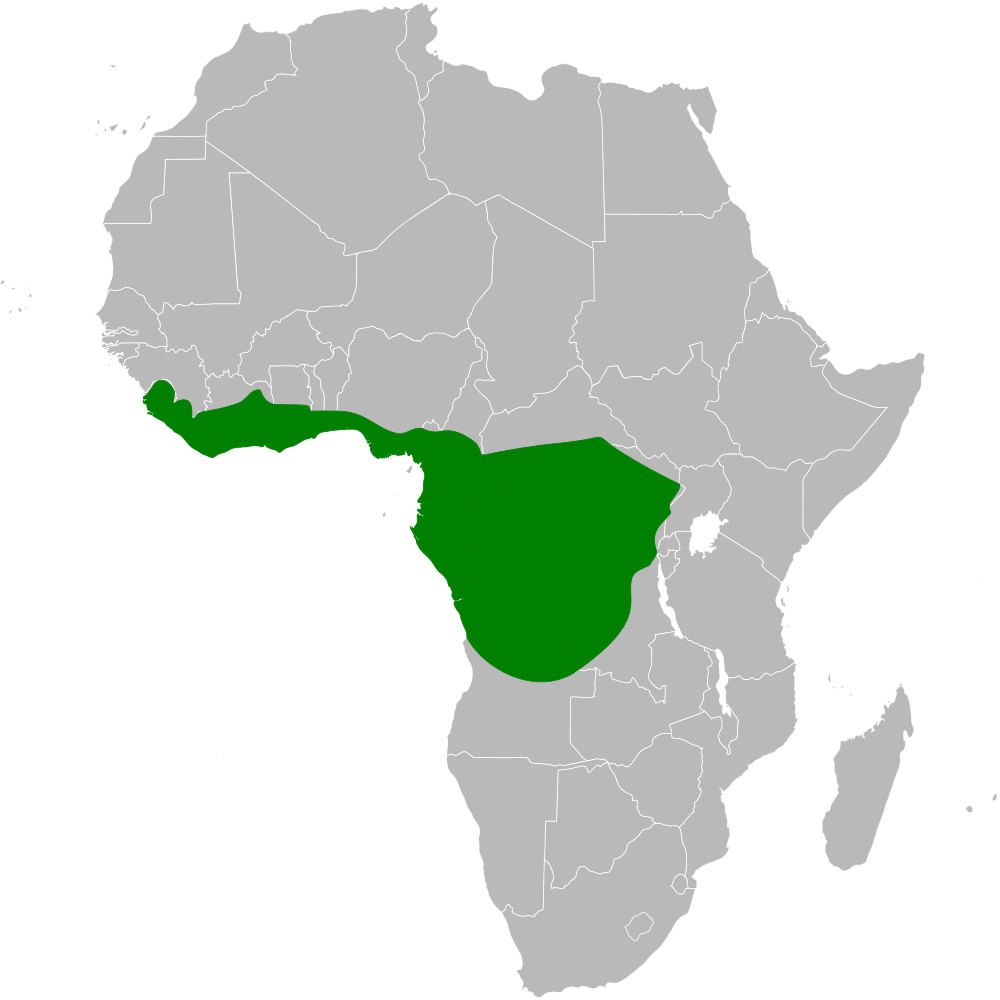
- resident range

= White-bibbed swallow =

Species of bird

The white-bibbed swallow (Hirundo nigrita), also known as the white-throated blue swallow, is a species of bird in the family Hirundinidae. The plumage is mainly glossy dark blue, but may appear black at a distance. It is widespread but generally uncommon across the African tropical rainforest (including Dahomey Gap). It is generally a resident, non-migratory bird, though it may undertake minor local movements. In Sierra Leone they are noted mainly from December to July, though long-distance seasonal migrations are not suspected. They are found year-round near tropical rivers, lakes, and rainforest streams. No subspecies are known.

They have solitary and territorial nesting habits. The open cup-shaped nests are built by both sexes, and placed from near the water surface to 3 meters up. The nest of mud pellets and some dry grass is lined on the inside with soft material, like feathers, bark strips or grass. Nests are placed on either natural sites like rock faces, cliffs, fallen trees, etc., or less often attached to man-made structures like bridges, piers, etc. The clutch consists of 2 to 3 eggs, and is incubated by the female. The eggs are white and speckled brown and greyish brown. Nestlings leave the nest in 17 to 18 days, but remain in the nest vicinity for some time longer.
