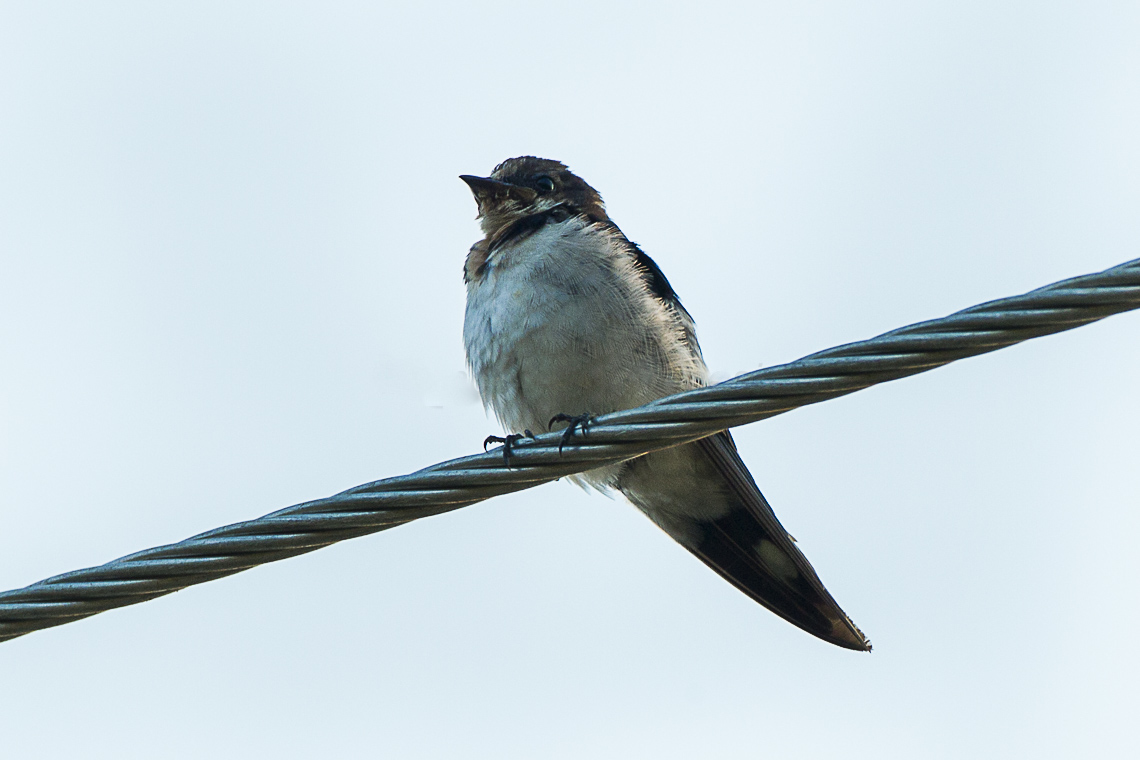
- In Kakum NP, Ghana

Conservation status
- Least Concern (IUCN 3.1)

Scientific classification
- Kingdom: Animalia
- Phylum: Chordata
- Class: Aves
- Order: Passeriformes
- Family: Hirundinidae
- Genus: Hirundo
- Species: H. aethiopica

Binomial name
- Hirundo aethiopica Blanford, 1869

= Ethiopian swallow =

Species of bird

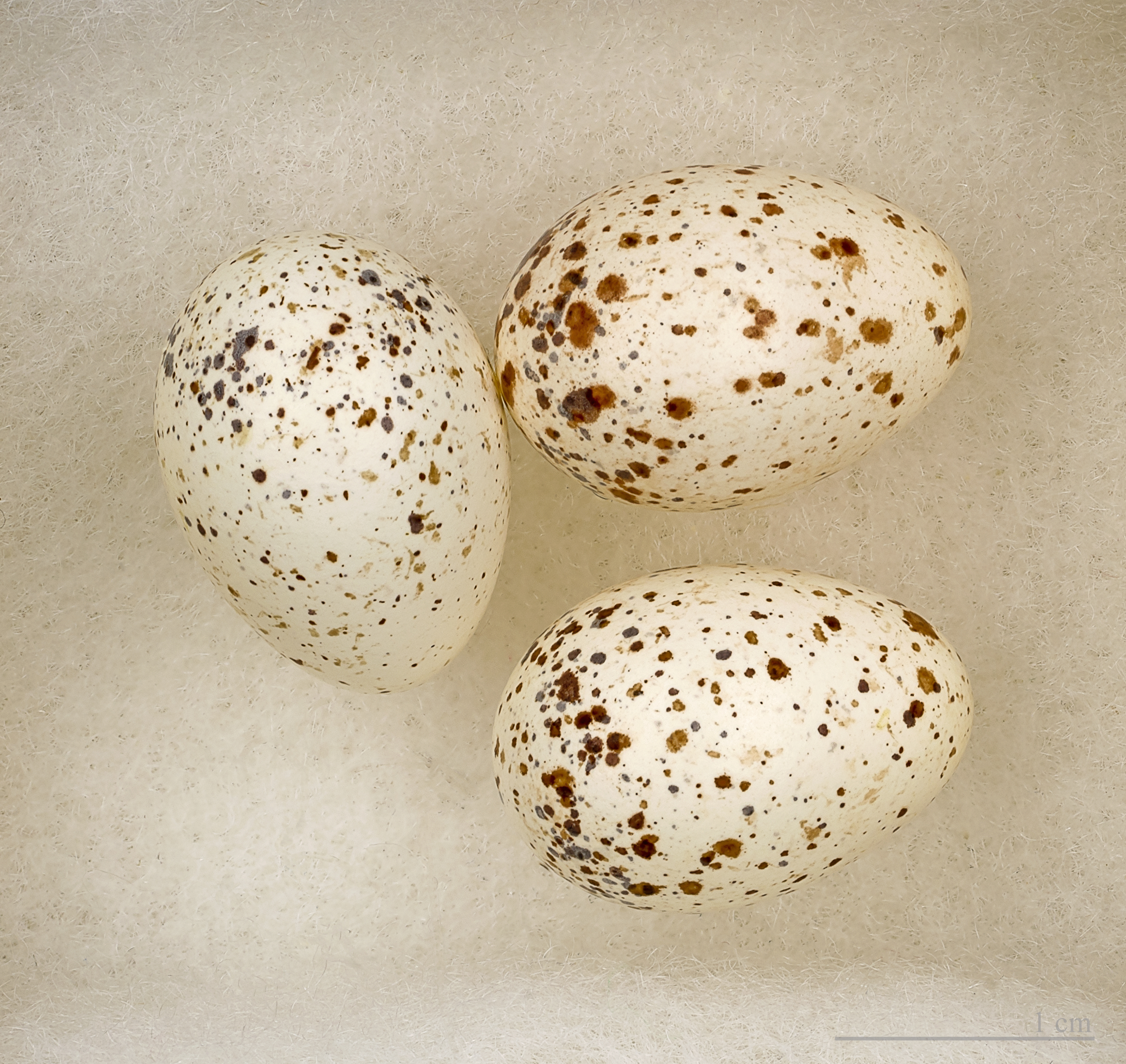
Hirundo aethiopica - MHNT

The Ethiopian swallow (Hirundo aethiopica) is a species of bird in the family Hirundinidae. Although it is non-migratory, its range is wide, extending from Benin to Burkina Faso, Cameroon, Central African Republic, Chad, Democratic Republic of the Congo, Ivory Coast, Eritrea, Ethiopia, Ghana, Guinea, Israel, Kenya, Mali, Niger, Nigeria, Senegal, Somalia, Sudan, Tanzania, Togo, Uganda.

It is often confused with the wire-tailed swallow.

== Social Behavior ==
It breeds and nests on cliffs and in buildings.
