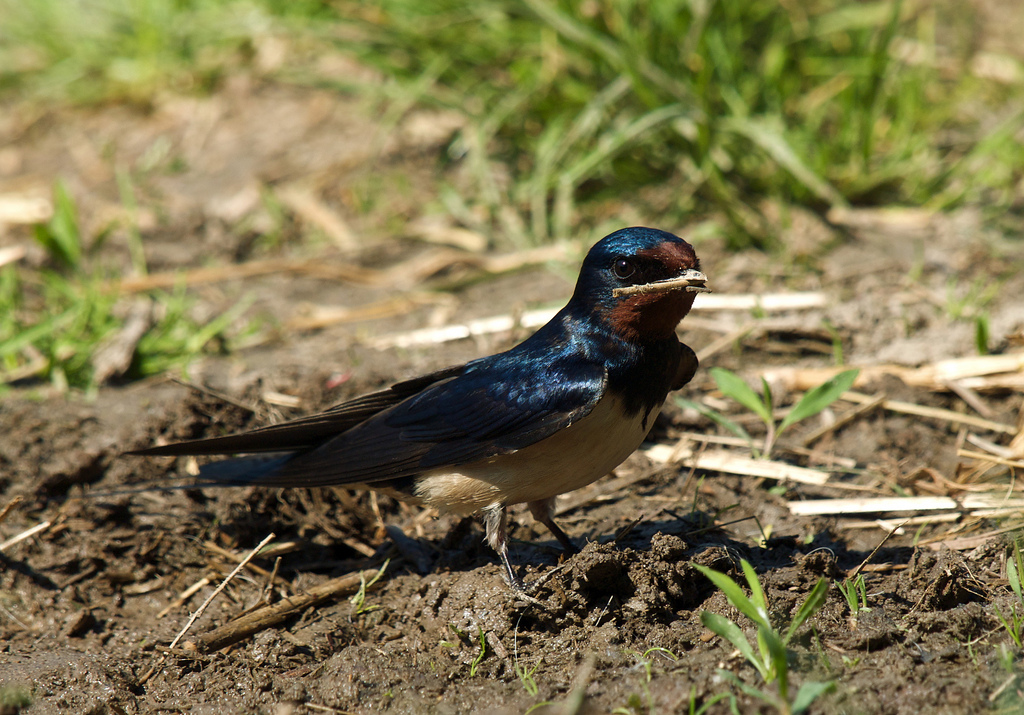
- A barn swallow collecting nest material in Germany

Scientific classification
- Kingdom: Animalia
- Phylum: Chordata
- Class: Aves
- Order: Passeriformes
- Family: Hirundinidae
- Subfamily: Hirundininae
- Genus: Hirundo; Linnaeus, 1758

Type species
- Hirundo rustica (barn swallow) Linnaeus, 1758

Species
- See text

= Hirundo =

Genus of birds

The bird genus Hirundo is a group of passerines in the family Hirundinidae (swallows and martins). The genus name is Latin for a swallow. These are the typical swallows, including the widespread barn swallow. Many of this group have blue backs, red on the face and sometimes the rump or nape, and whitish or rufous underparts. With fifteen species this genus is the largest in its family.

== Taxonomy ==
The genus Hirundo was introduced in 1758 by the Swedish naturalist Carl Linnaeus in the tenth edition of his Systema Naturae. The genus name is the Latin word for a swallow. Linnaeus included eight species in the genus and of these William Swainson designated the barn swallow (Hirundo rustica) as the type species.

=== Extant species ===
The genus contains sixteen species. The linear sequence is based on two molecular phylogenetic studies published in 2005 and 2018.

Image	Common name	Scientific name	Distribution
	Black-and-rufous swallow	Hirundo nigrorufa	Angola, Democratic Republic of the Congo and Zambia.
	Blue swallow	Hirundo atrocaerulea	From South Africa to Tanzania
	Pied-winged swallow	Hirundo leucosoma	Benin, Burkina Faso, Cameroon, Ivory Coast, Gambia, Ghana, Guinea, Guinea-Bissau, Mali, Niger, Nigeria, Senegal, Sierra Leone, and Togo.
	White-tailed swallow	Hirundo megaensis	Oromia, Ethiopia.
	Pearl-breasted swallow	Hirundo dimidiata	Southern Africa from Angola, southern Congo and Tanzania southwards.
	Pacific swallow	Hirundo javanica	Southern Asia and the islands of the south Pacific.
	Tahiti swallow	Hirundo tahitica	Islands of Moorea and Tahiti in French Polynesia
	Hill swallow	Hirundo domicola	Southern India and Sri Lanka.
	Welcome swallow	Hirundo neoxena	Australia and nearby islands.
	White-throated swallow	Hirundo albigularis	Southern Africa from Angola and Zambia southwards to the Cape in South Africa.
	Wire-tailed swallow	Hirundo smithii	Southern Africa and southeastern Asia.
	White-bibbed swallow	Hirundo nigrita	Angola, Benin, Cameroon, Central African Republic, Republic of the Congo, Democratic Republic of the Congo, Ivory Coast, Equatorial Guinea, Gabon, Ghana, Guinea, Guinea-Bissau, Liberia, Nigeria, Sierra Leone, and Uganda.
	Barn swallow	Hirundo rustica	North and South America, most of Africa aside from the Sahara Desert, most of Eurasia aside from the northern Siberia, and northern Australia.
	Angola swallow	Hirundo angolensis	Angola, Burundi, Democratic Republic of the Congo, Gabon, Kenya, Malawi, Namibia, Rwanda, Tanzania, Uganda, and Zambia.
	Red-chested swallow	Hirundo lucida	West Africa, the Congo Basin and Ethiopia.
	Ethiopian swallow	Hirundo aethiopica	Benin to Burkina Faso, Cameroon, Central African Republic, Chad, Democratic Republic of the Congo, Ivory Coast, Eritrea, Ethiopia, Ghana, Guinea, Israel, Kenya, Mali, Niger, Nigeria, Senegal, Somalia, Sudan, Tanzania, Togo, Uganda.

=== Extinct species ===
There are at least two fossil species included in this genus:

- †Hirundo gracilis (late Miocene of Polgardi, Hungary)
- †Hirundo major (Pliocene of Csarnota, Hungary)

=== Former species ===
Some authorities, either presently or formerly, recognize several additional species as belonging to the genus Hirundo including:

- West African swallow (as Hirundo domicella)

== Distribution and habitat ==
All of the species are found in the Old World, although one, the barn swallow, is cosmopolitan, also occurring in the Americas.

== Gallery ==
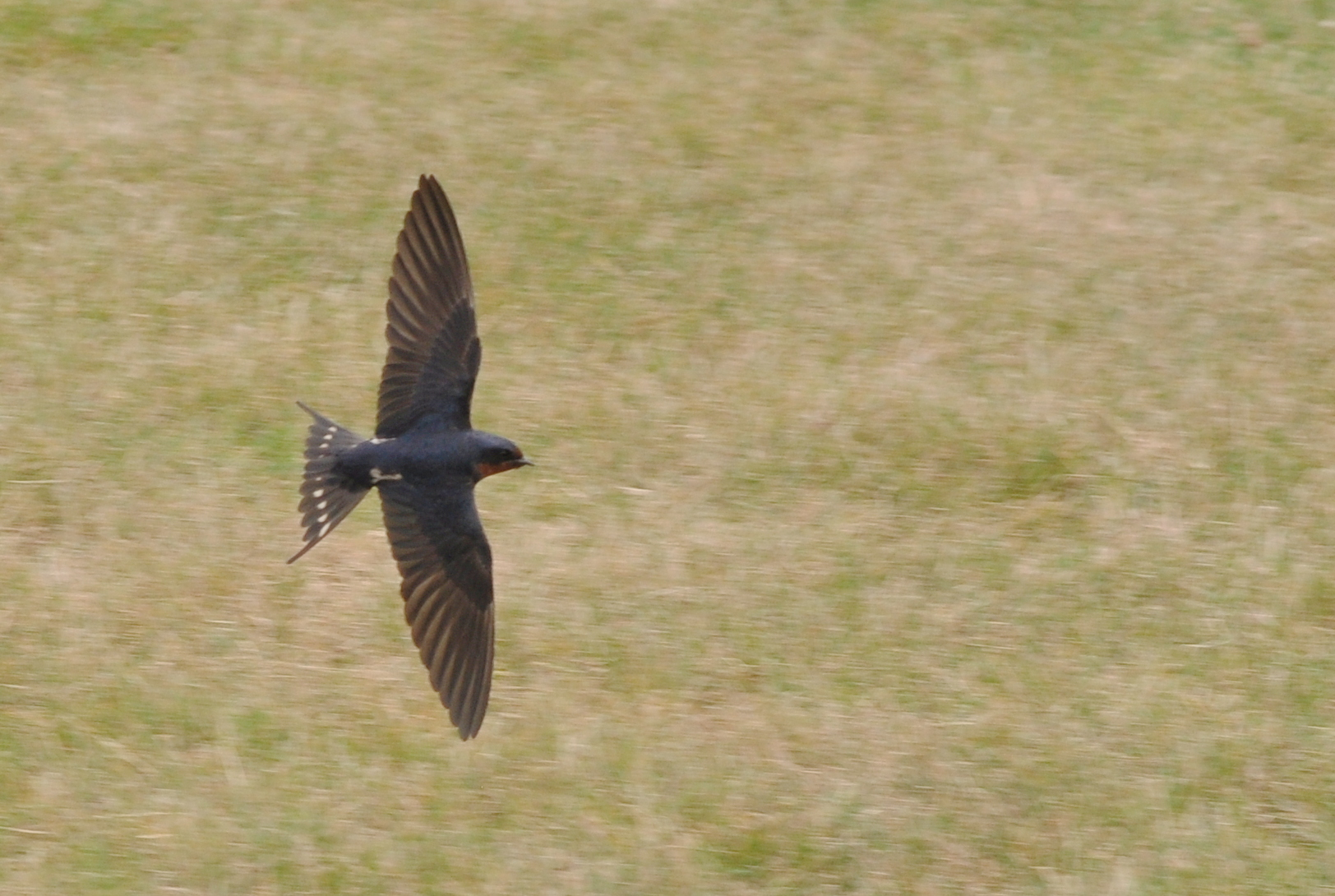
H. rustica foraging

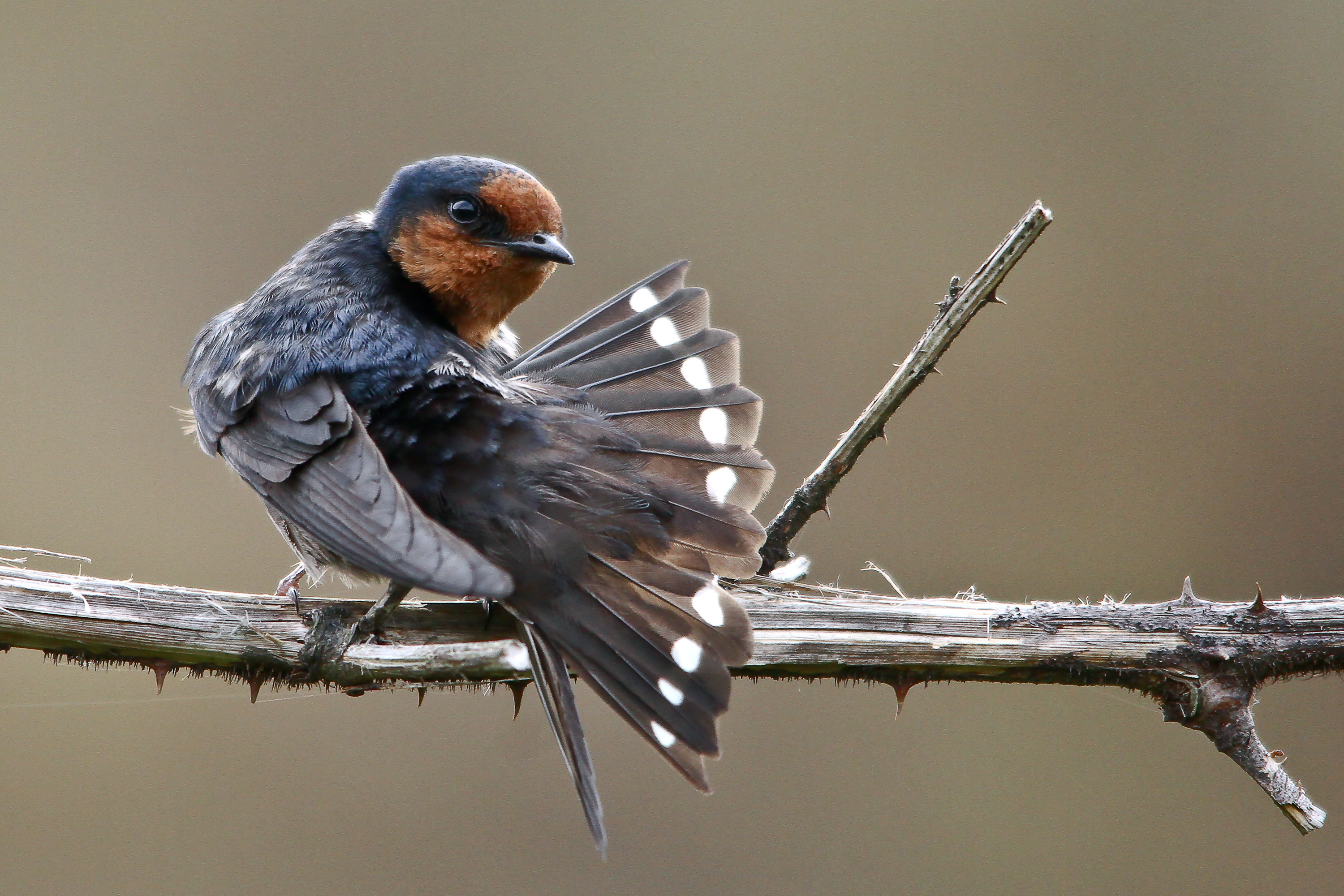
Windows in the tail of H. rustica

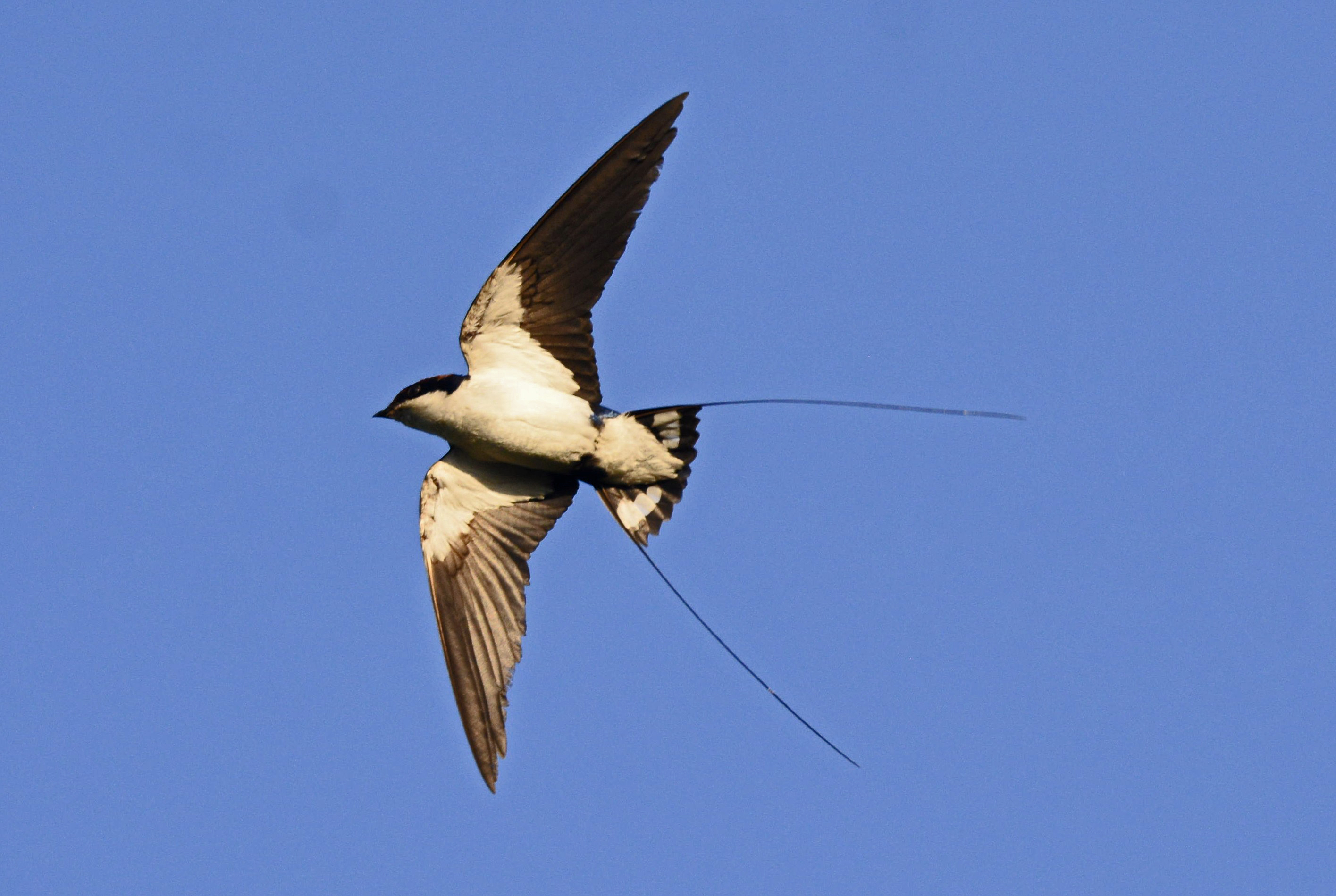
Tail streamers of H. smithii filifera

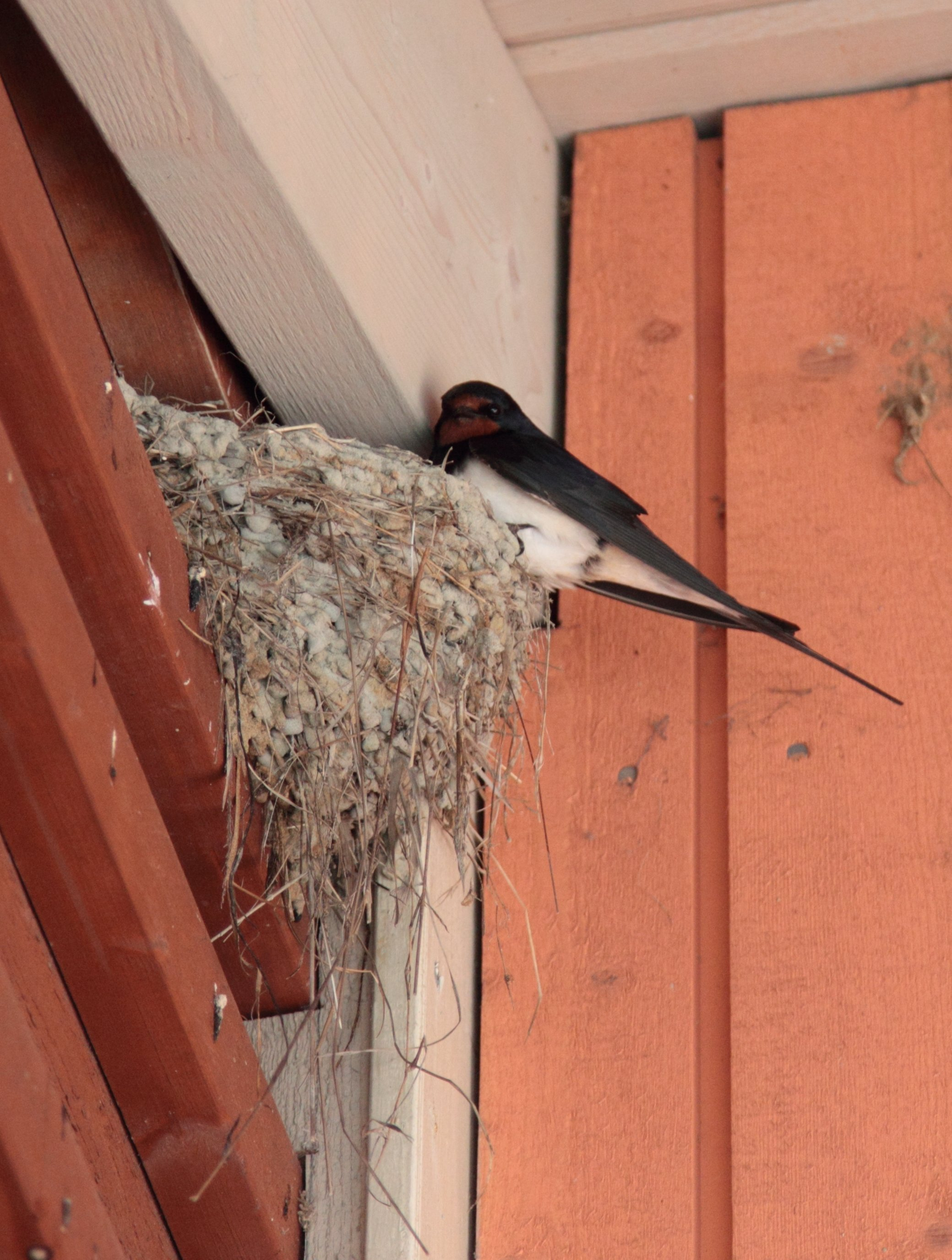
Nest of H. rustica

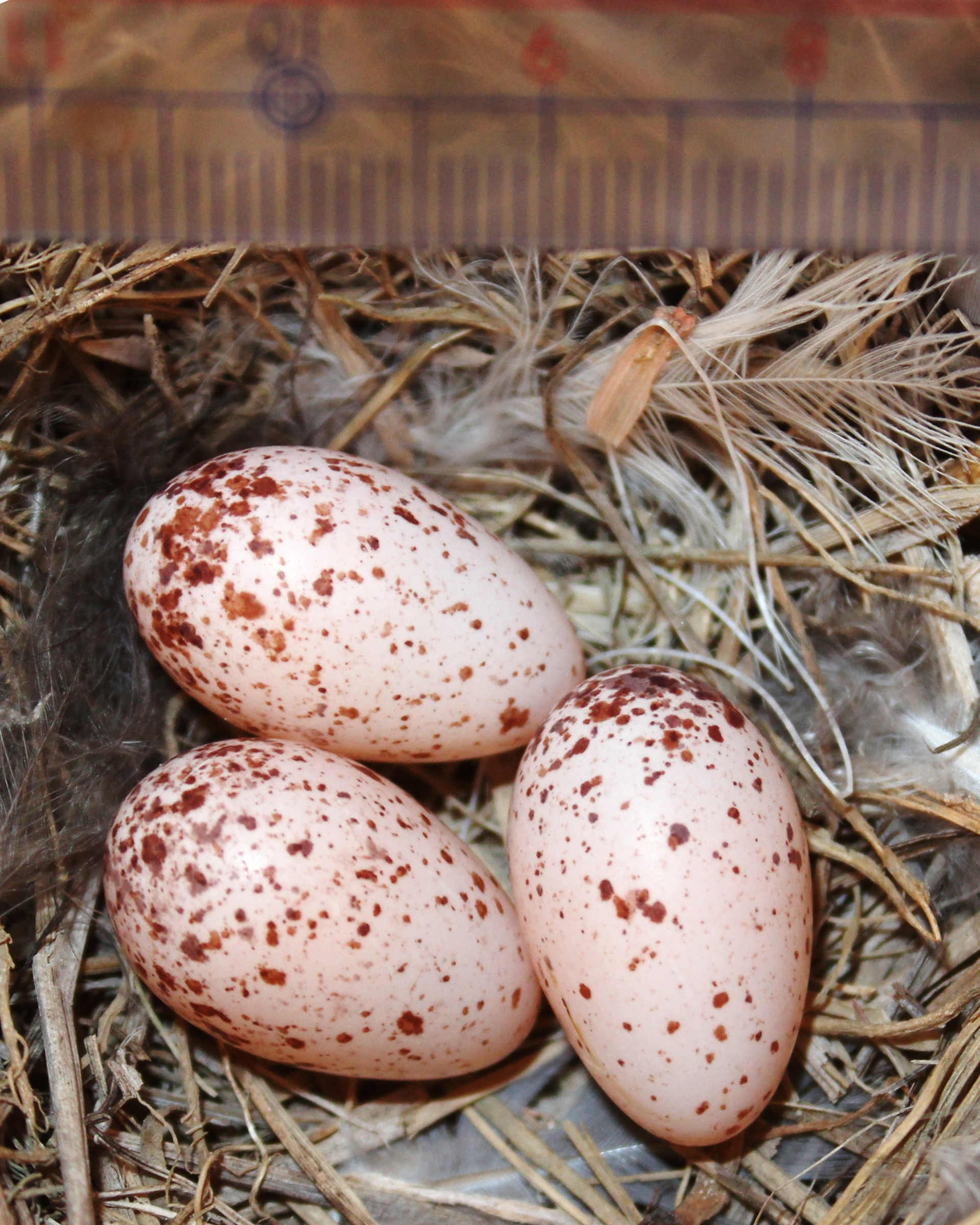
Clutch of H. rustica gutturalis

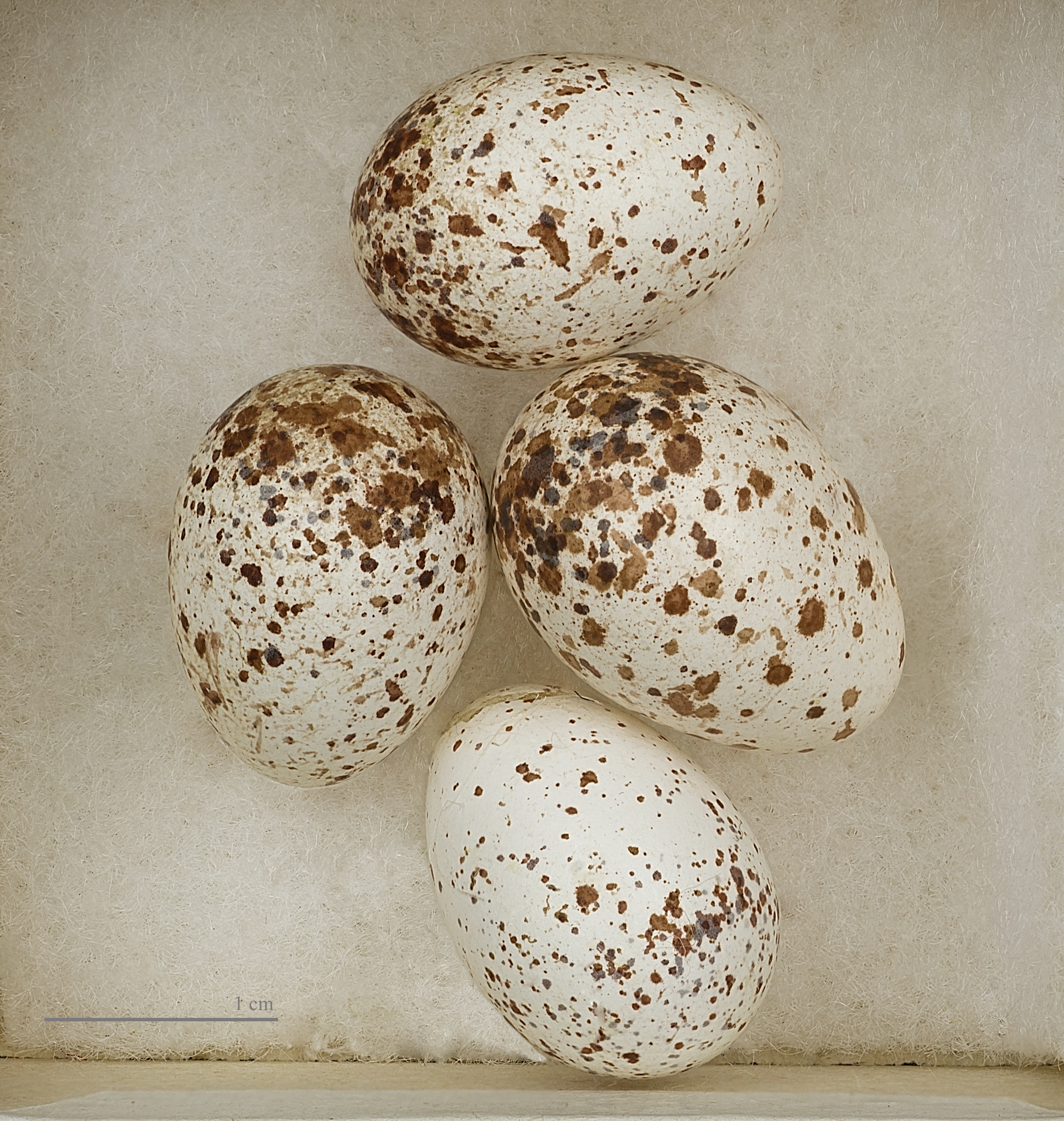
Clutch of H. smithii
