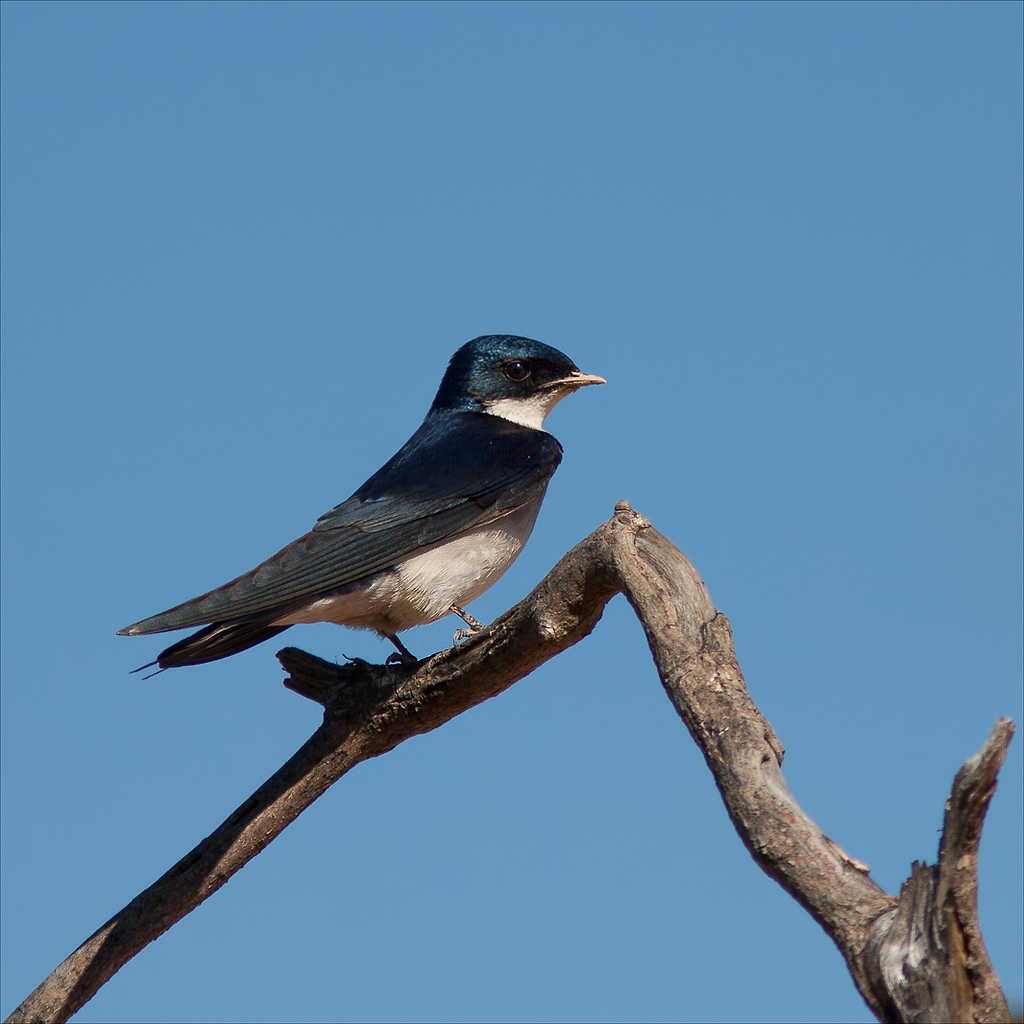
- at Botriver, South Africa

Conservation status
- Least Concern (IUCN 3.1)

Scientific classification
- Kingdom: Animalia
- Phylum: Chordata
- Class: Aves
- Order: Passeriformes
- Family: Hirundinidae
- Genus: Hirundo
- Species: H. dimidiata

Binomial name
- Hirundo dimidiata Sundevall, 1850

= Pearl-breasted swallow =

Species of bird

The pearl-breasted swallow (Hirundo dimidiata) is a small swallow.

== Description ==
The pearl-breasted swallow is 13–14 cm long. It has glossy blue upperparts and grey-white underparts. The upper wings, underwing flight feathers and forked tail are blackish-blue. The underwing coverts are a darker shade of grey-white. The lack of white in the tail is a distinction from similar Hirundo species. The outer feathers are slightly longer in the male than the female. Juveniles are duller and browner than the adult, with shorter outer tail feathers. The northern subspecies, H. d. marwitzi is darker and smaller than nominate H. d. dimidiata, but the differences are small, and the species may be monotypic.

== Distribution and habitat ==
The pearl-breasted swallow breeds in southern Africa from Angola, southern Congo and Tanzania southwards. It is sparsely distributed, but can be locally common. It is partially migratory with many birds from the southwest of South Africa wintering further north. This is a bird of dry scrub, farmland and clearings. It is often found around human habitation.

== Behaviour ==
The pearl-breasted swallow feeds mainly on flying insects, with a fast direct flight. The call is a chittering chip cheree chip chip.

=== Breeding ===
It builds a bowl-shaped mud nest reinforced with grass or hair and with a soft lining. It sometimes uses old nests of the greater striped swallow, Cecropis cucullata. The nest may be reused in later years, and one was utilised for 30 years. The nest is built in natural cavities or man-made structures such as buildings, culverts and shafts, but its preference for isolated and abandoned buildings means that this species has not benefited from artificial sites to the same extent as, for example, the greater or lesser striped swallows. The two or three eggs are pure white, and are incubated by the female alone for 16–17 days to hatching. Both parents then feed the chicks. Fledging takes another 20–23 days, but the young birds will return to the nest to roost for a few days after the first flight.

== Gallery ==
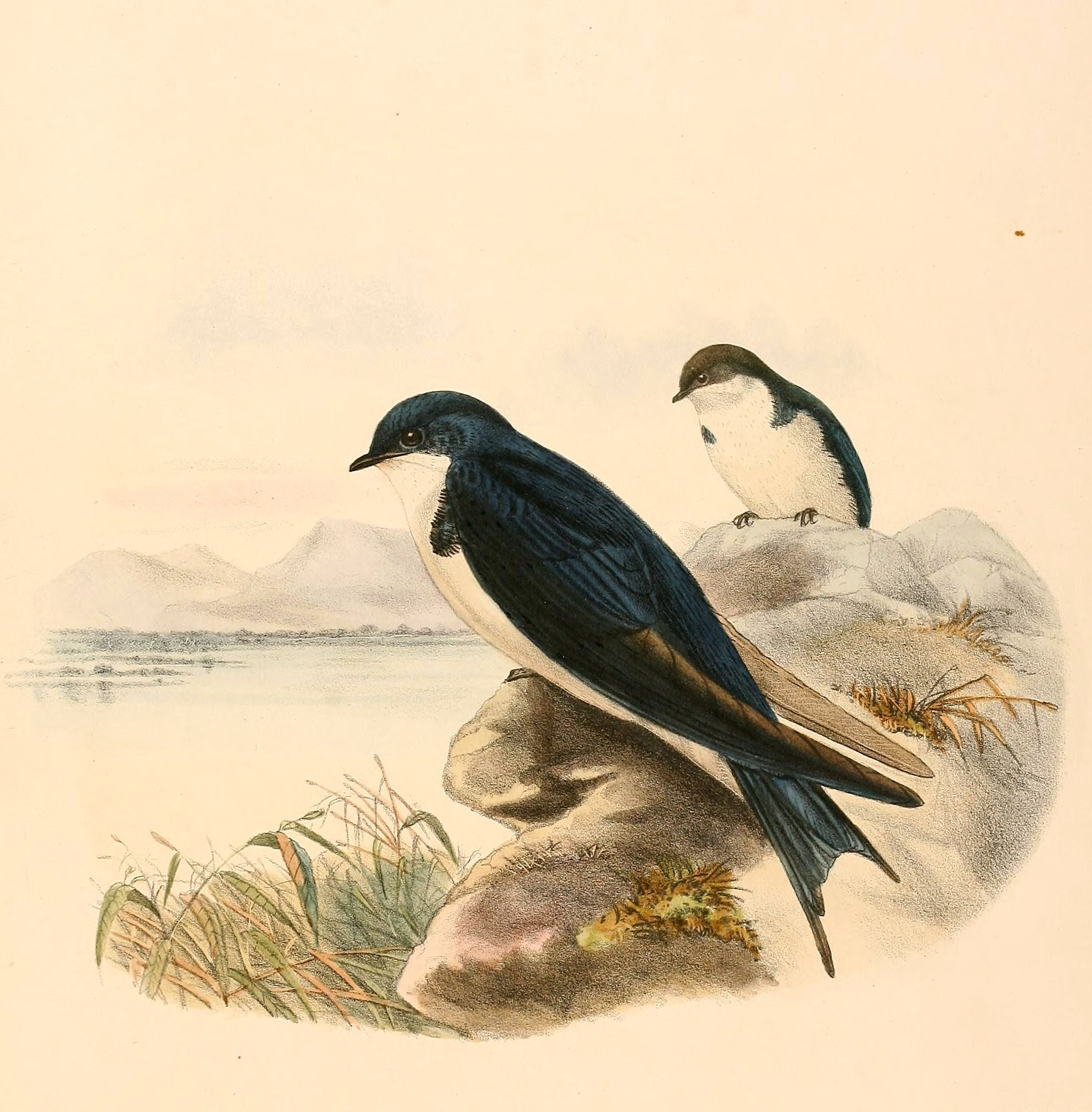
Illustration by R. B. Sharpe (1894)
