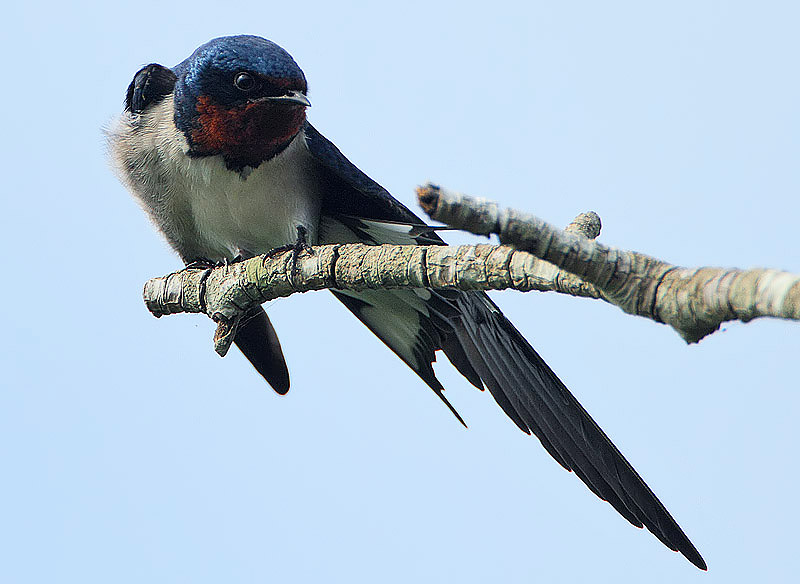
- Male in Makasutu, The Gambia

Conservation status
- Least Concern (IUCN 3.1)

Scientific classification
- Kingdom: Animalia
- Phylum: Chordata
- Class: Aves
- Order: Passeriformes
- Family: Hirundinidae
- Genus: Hirundo
- Species: H. lucida

Binomial name
- Hirundo lucida Hartlaub, 1858
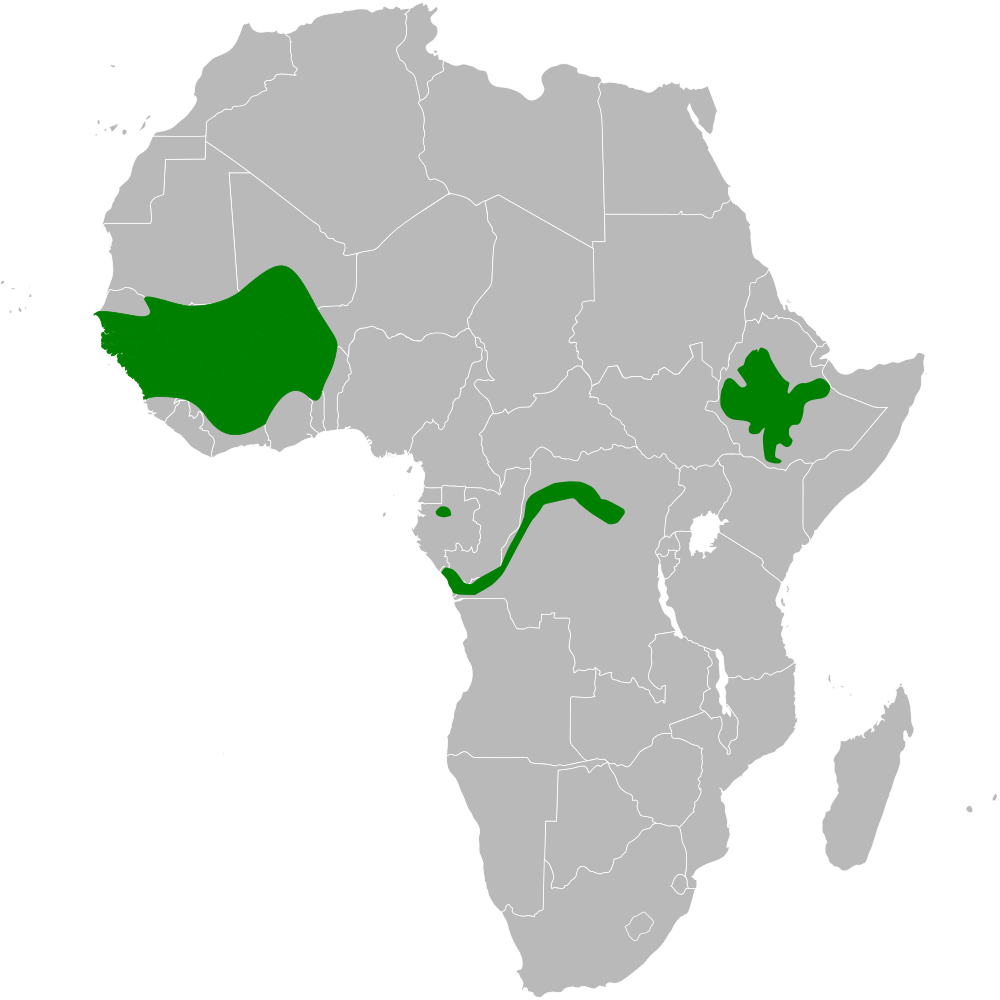

= Red-chested swallow =

Species of bird

The red-chested swallow (Hirundo lucida) is a small non-migratory passerine bird found in West Africa, the Congo Basin and Ethiopia. It has a long, deeply forked tail and curved, pointed wings.

It was formerly considered a subspecies of the closely resembling barn swallow. However, the adult red-chested swallow differs in being slightly smaller than its migratory relative, in addition to having a narrower blue breast band and shorter tail streamers. Juveniles are more comparable to barn swallow chicks.
