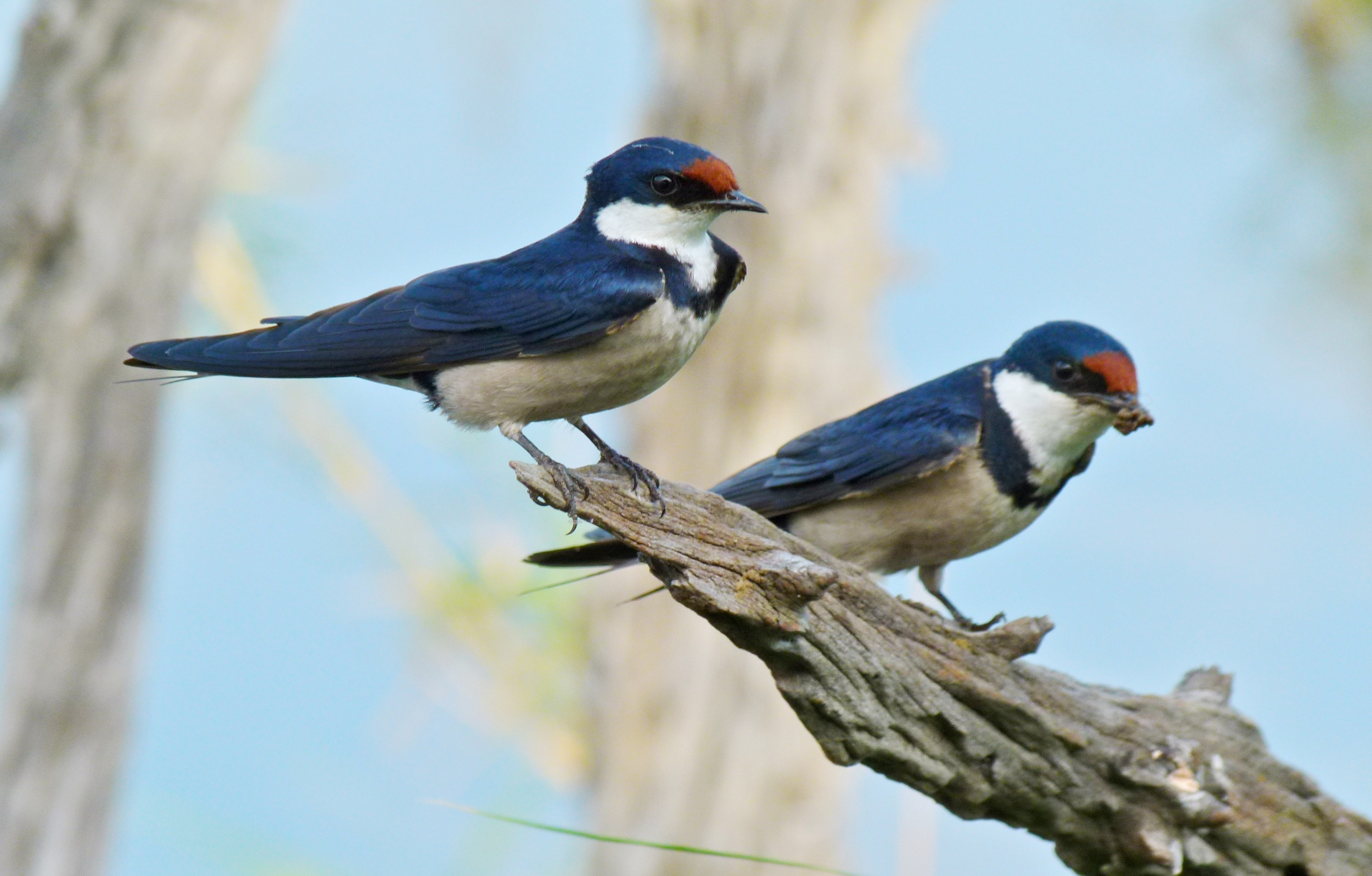
- In Pilanesberg NP, South Africa

Conservation status
- Least Concern (IUCN 3.1)

Scientific classification
- Kingdom: Animalia
- Phylum: Chordata
- Class: Aves
- Order: Passeriformes
- Family: Hirundinidae
- Genus: Hirundo
- Species: H. albigularis

Binomial name
- Hirundo albigularis Strickland, 1849
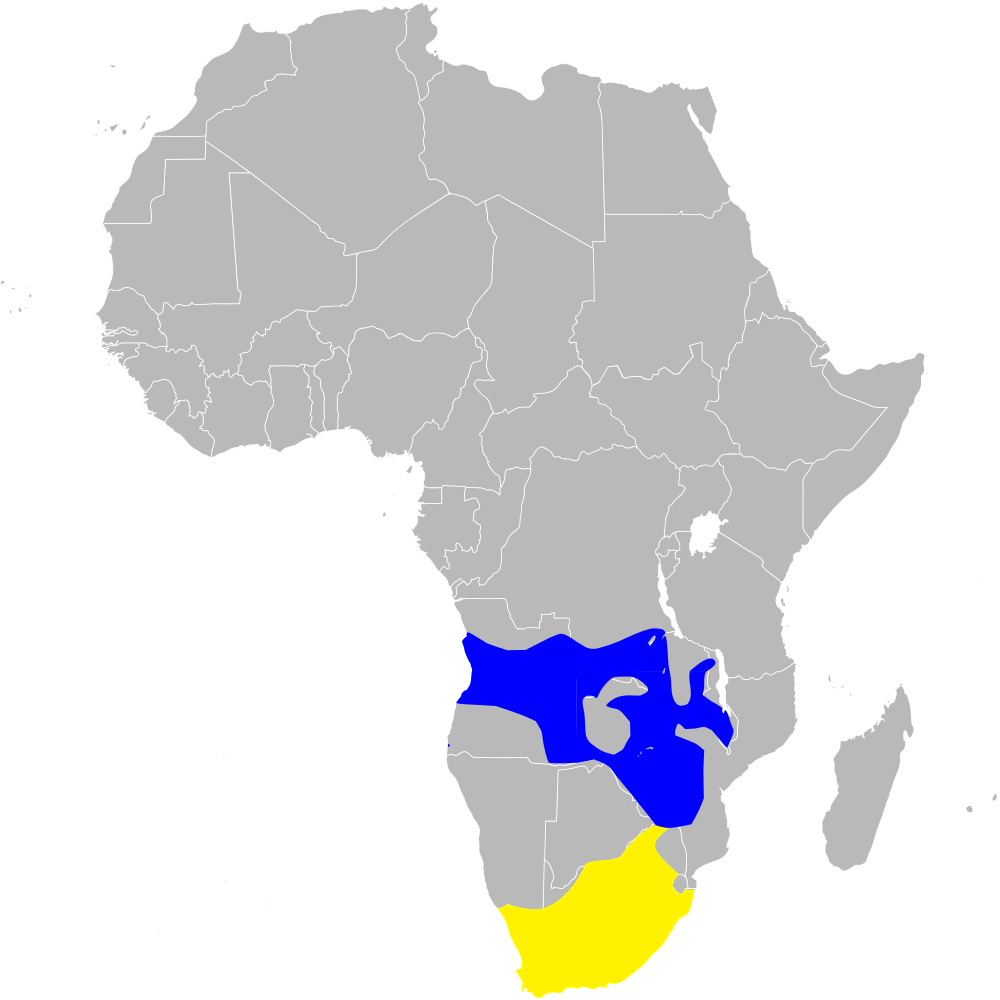
- approximate range austral winter austral summer

= White-throated swallow =

Species of bird

The white-throated swallow (Hirundo albigularis) is a small bird in the swallow family. It is a common species, found in southern Africa, which has benefited from the increased nesting opportunities presented by the construction of bridges and dams.

== Description ==
The white-throated swallow is 14–17 cm long. It has glossy dark blue upperparts and a bright chestnut crown. A dark blue-black breast band separates the white throat from the greyish white underparts and underwing coverts. The upper wings, underwing flight feathers and forked tail are blackish-blue, but the undertail has white patches near the feather tips. The white throat and blackish breast band are distinctions from similar Hirundo species. The outer feathers are slightly longer in the male than the female. Juveniles are duller than the adult, with shorter outer tail feathers and a browner crown. The call is a mix of warbles and twitters.

== Distribution and habitat ==
The swallow breeds in southern Africa from Angola and Zambia southwards to the Cape in South Africa. It is mainly migratory, wintering in Angola, Zambia and southern Zaire. This is a bird of open country and grassland, with a preference for highlands and nearby water. It is often found around man-made structures.

== Behaviour ==
=== Feeding ===
It feeds mainly on flying insects, which it pursues with a fast twisting flight like a barn swallow.

=== Breeding ===
The white-throated swallow builds a bowl-shaped mud nest with a soft lining of grass or hair. It is usually near or over water, and is built on a ledge under an overhang on a rock face or on a man-made structure such as a building, dam wall, culvert or bridge. Uninhabited buildings are preferred to houses. The nest may be reused for subsequent broods or in later years.

The three eggs of a typical clutch are white with brown and blue blotches, and are incubated by the female alone for 15–16 days to hatching. Both parents then feed the chicks. Fledging takes another 20–21 days, but the young birds will return to the nest to roost for a few days after the first flight. The young can swim a short distance to safety if they fall from the nest.

== Gallery ==
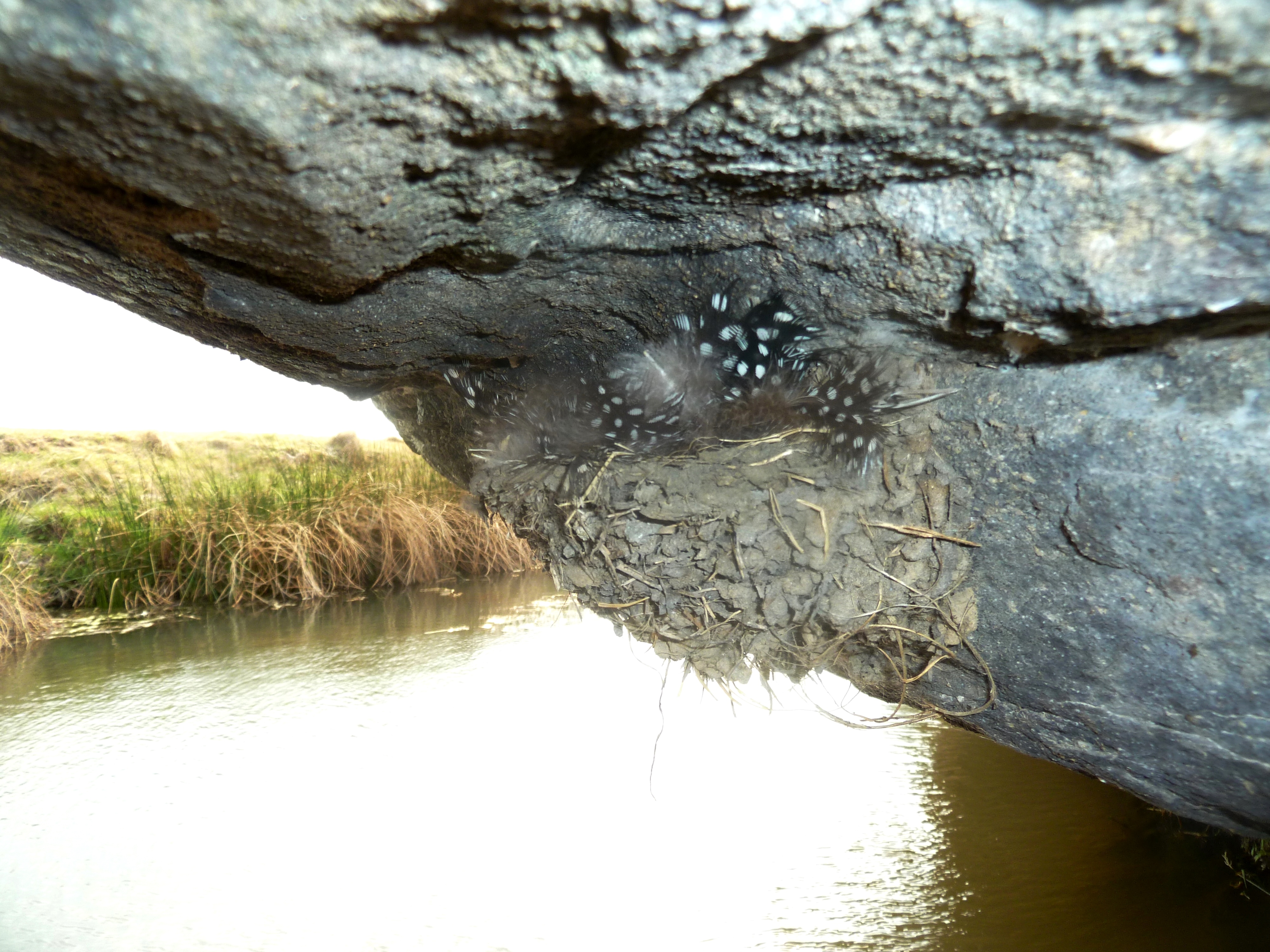
Nest in a natural setting

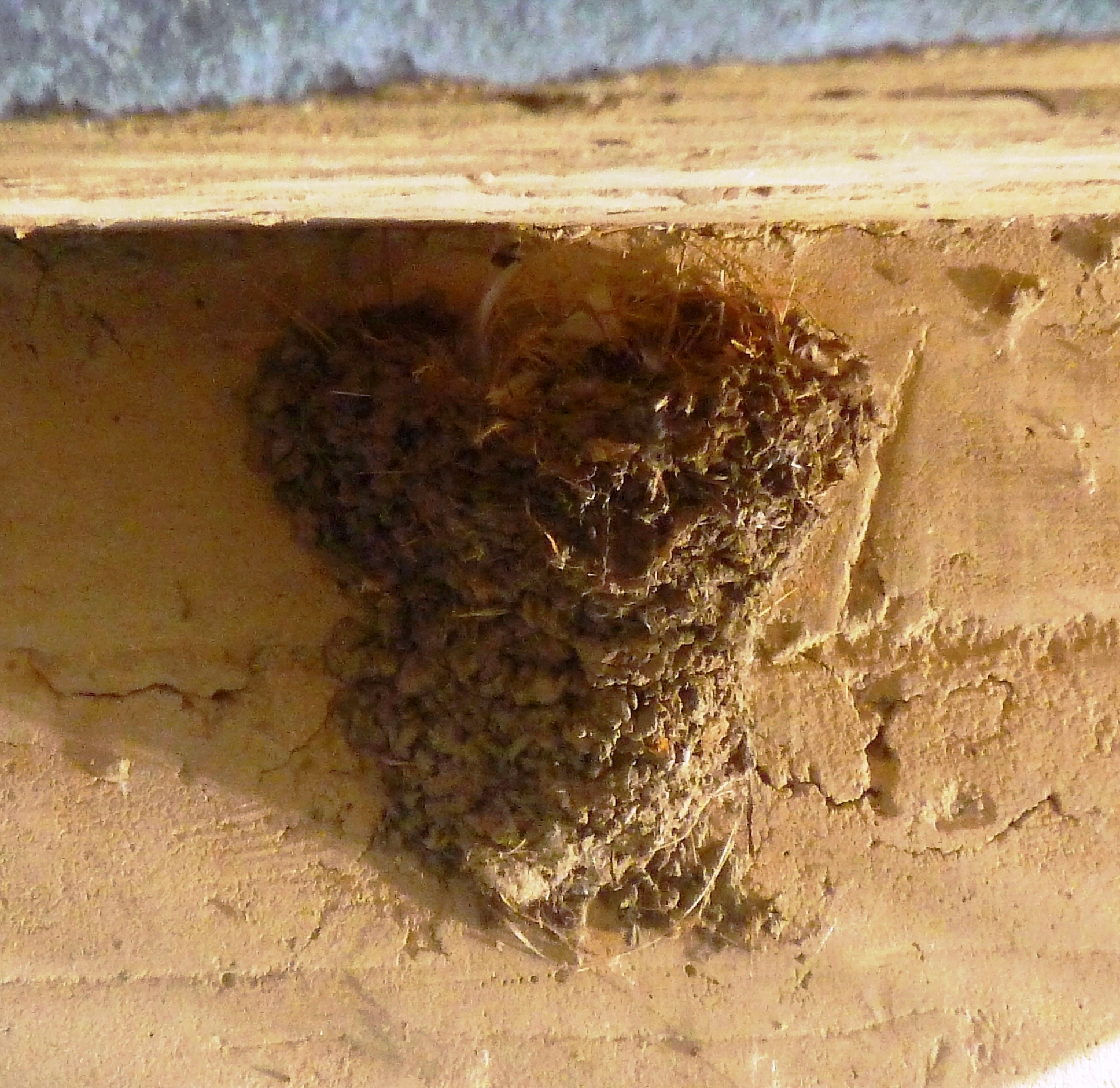
Nest under a bridge

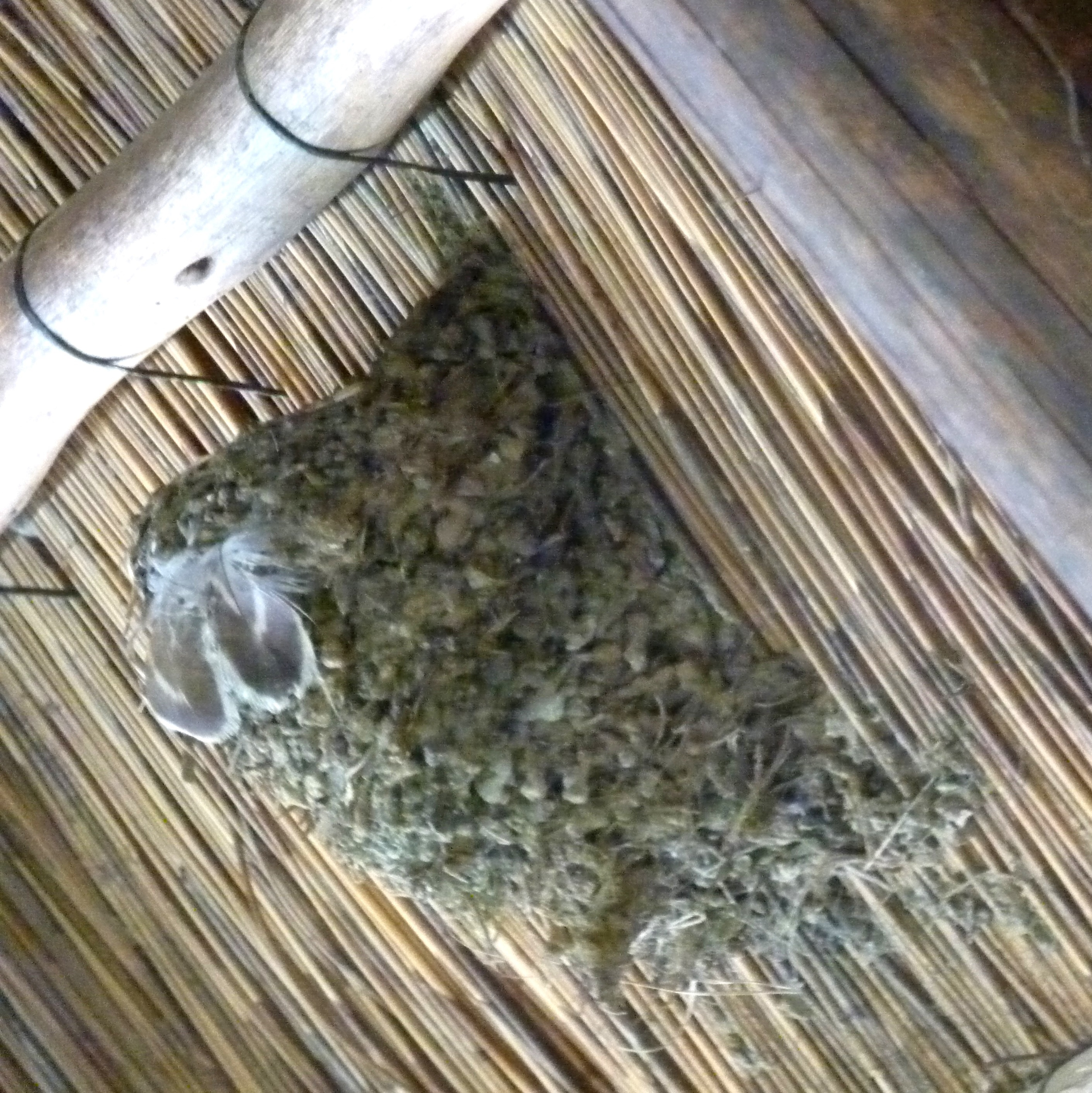
Nest against a thatch roof

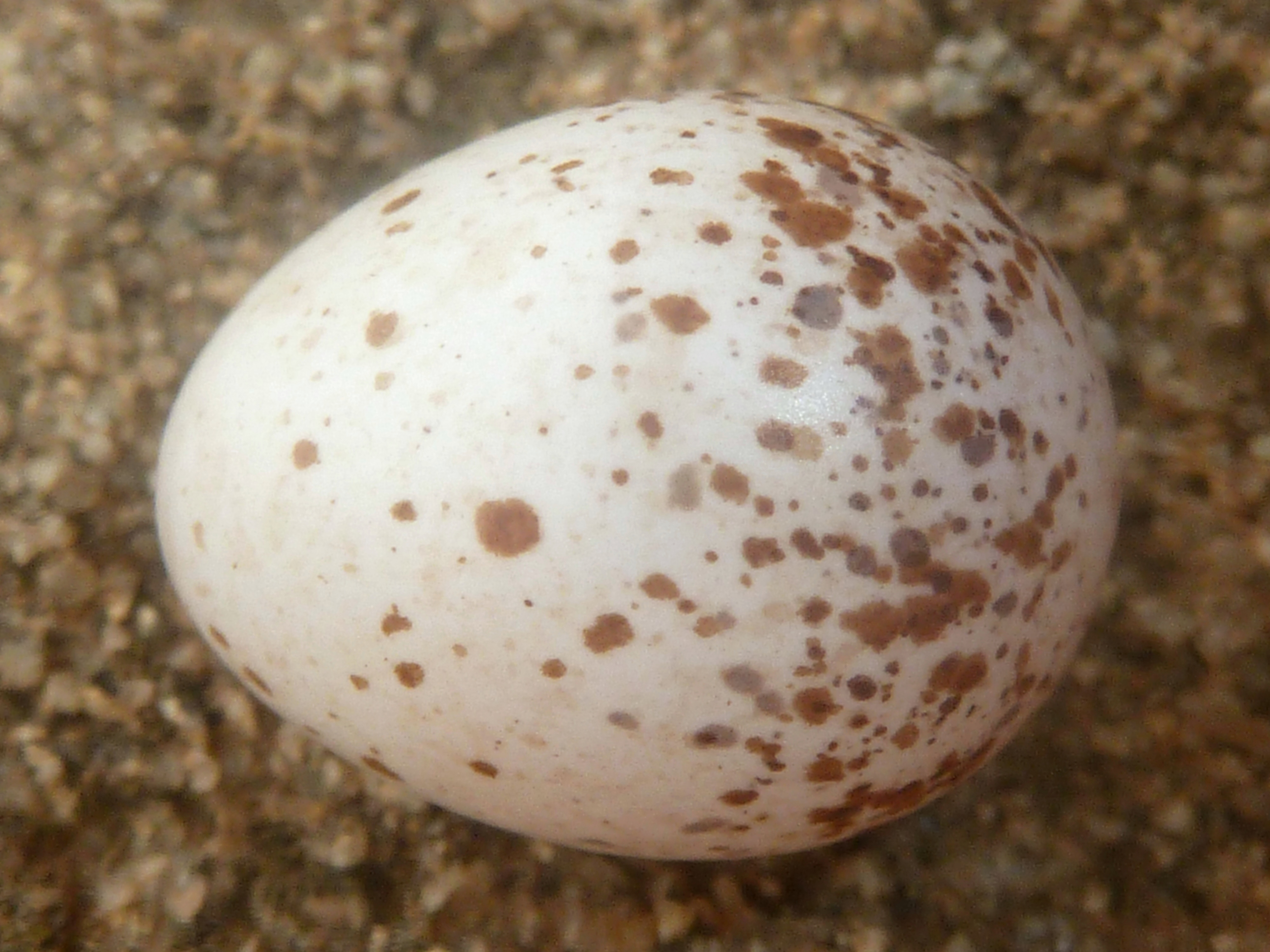
Egg

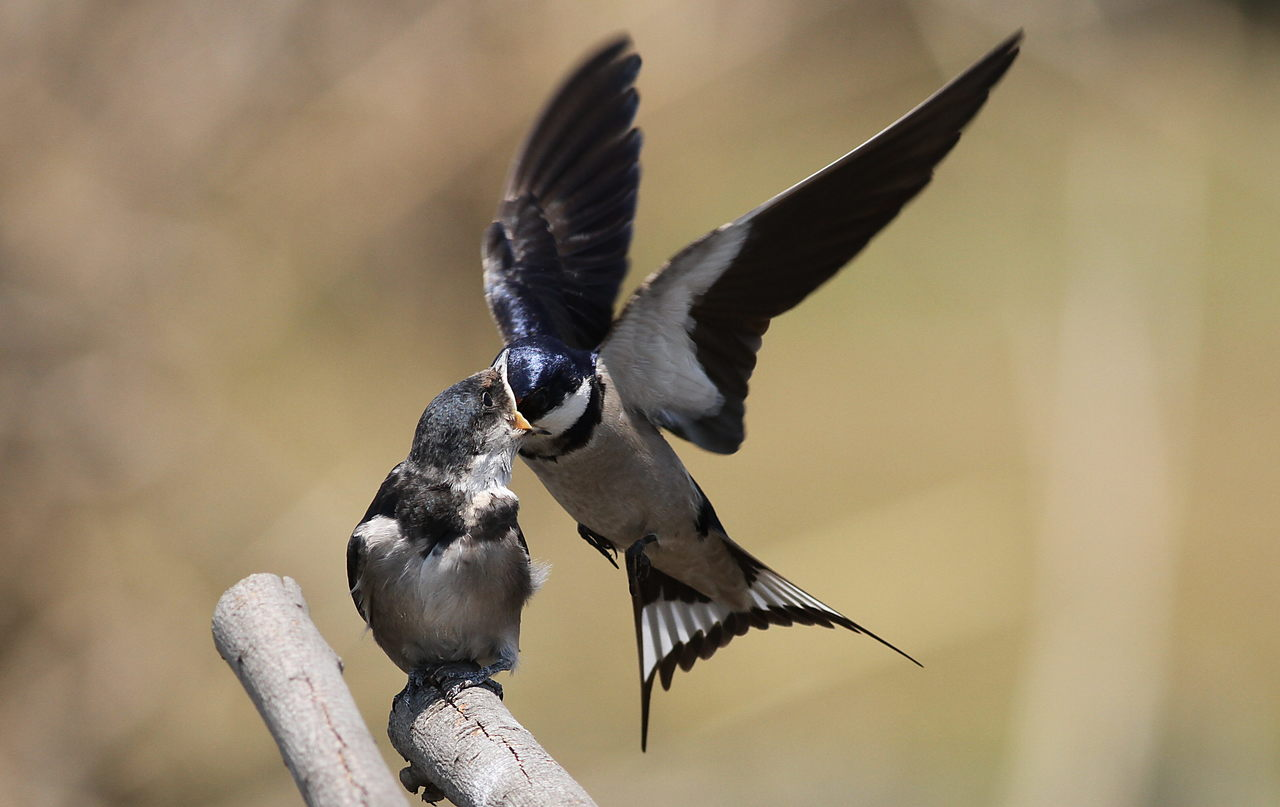
Parent feeding fledgling
