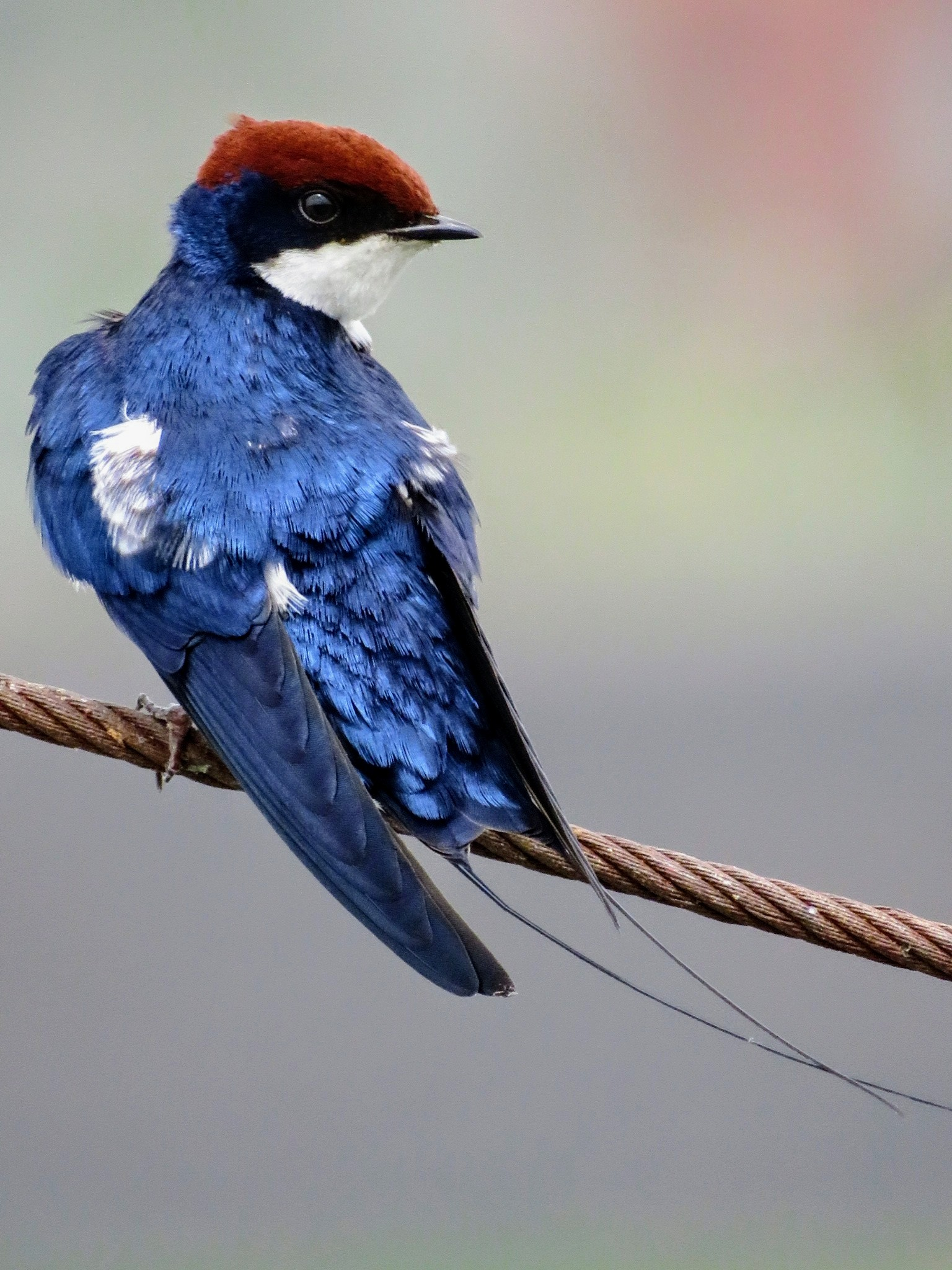
- At Mahisagar River, Vadodara

Conservation status
- Least Concern (IUCN 3.1)

Scientific classification
- Kingdom: Animalia
- Phylum: Chordata
- Class: Aves
- Order: Passeriformes
- Family: Hirundinidae
- Genus: Hirundo
- Species: H. smithii

Binomial name
- Hirundo smithii Leach, 1818

= Wire-tailed swallow =

Species of bird

The wire-tailed swallow (Hirundo smithii) is a small passerine bird in the swallow family. It has two subspecies: H. s. smithii, which occurs throughout Africa, and H. s. filifera, which is found in southern and southeastern Asia. It is mainly resident, but populations in Pakistan and northern India migrate further south in winter. The genus name Hirundo is the Latin word for swallow. The species name smithii commemorates Christen Smith, a Norwegian botanist and geologist.

== Description ==
The wire-tailed swallow is a small swallow, measuring 18 cm (7.1 in) in length. It has bright blue upperparts, bright white underparts and a chestnut cap. Immature birds lack tail wires, and have dull brown (rather than chestnut) caps. The species is named for the very long filamentous outermost tail feathers, which trail behind like two wires. The sexes are similar in appearance, but the female has shorter "wires". Juveniles have a brown crown, back and tail. The Asian form, H. s. filifera, is larger and longer-tailed than the abundant African H. s. smithii.

== Habits ==
This bird is found in open country near water and human habitation. Wire-tailed swallows are fast flyers and they generally feed on insects, especially flies, while airborne. They are typically seen low over water, with which they are more closely associated than most swallows.

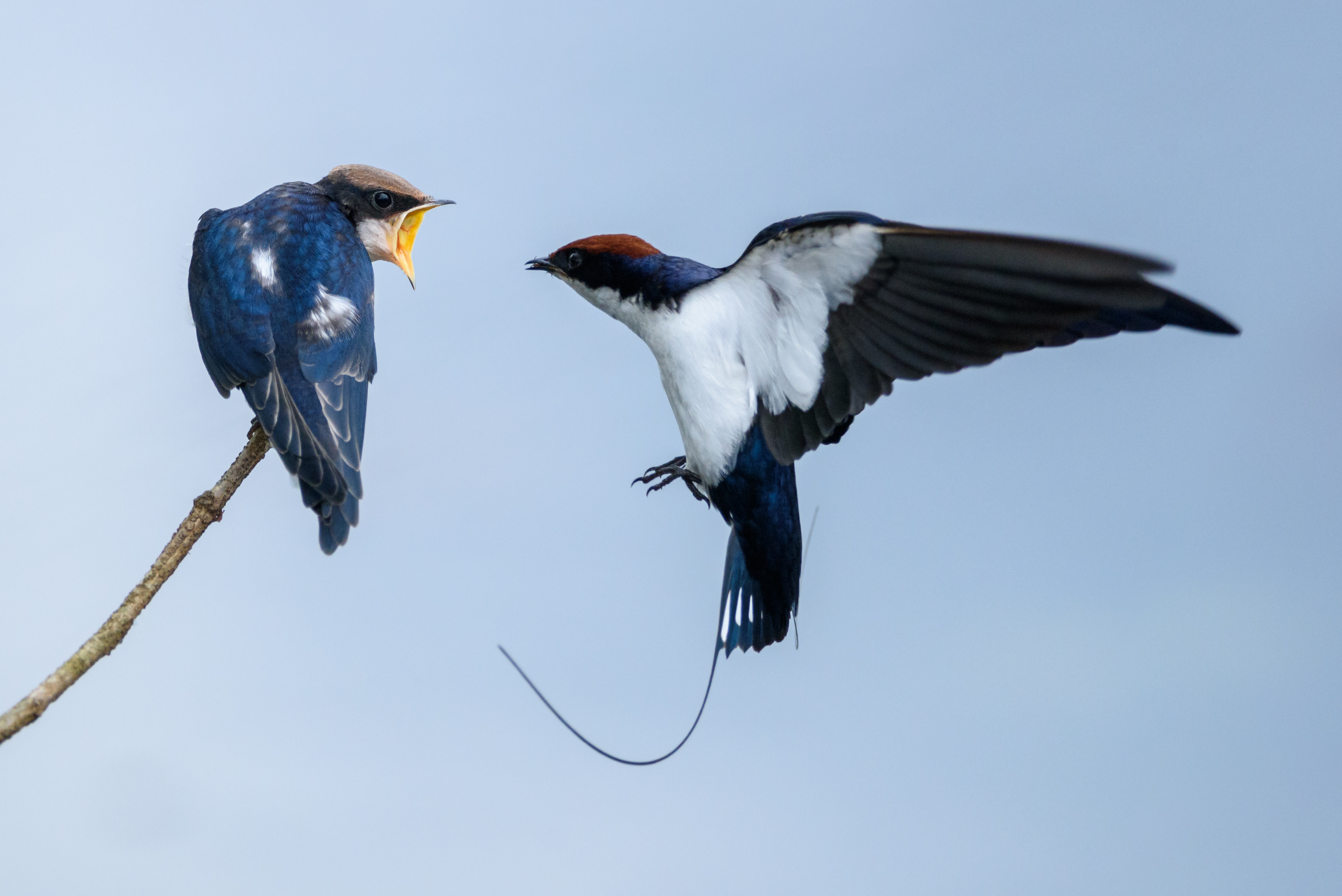
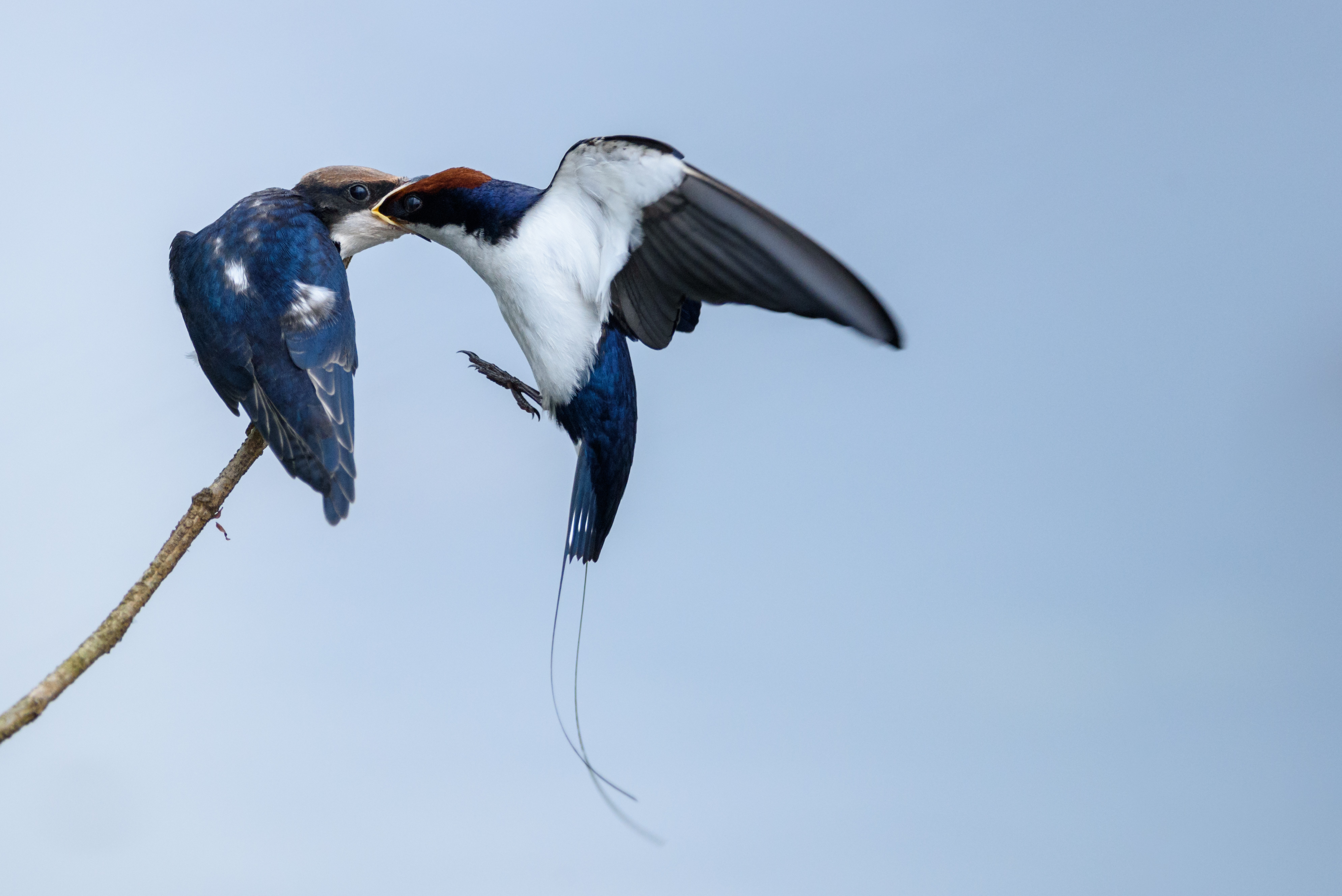
Feeding its offspring

== Nesting ==
The neat half-bowl nests are lined with mud collected in the swallows' beaks. They are placed on vertical surfaces near water under cliff ledges or nowadays more commonly on man-made structures such as buildings and bridges. The clutch is three to four eggs in Africa, up to five in Asia (Turner and Rose). These birds are solitary and territorial nesters, unlike many swallows, which tend to be colonial.

== Taxonomy and systematics ==
The wire-tailed swallow is a member of the genus Hirundo, a cosmopolitan group of "barn swallows". It has two subspecies:

- H. s. smithii was first described by William Elford Leach and K. D. Koenig in 1818. Known as the African wire-tailed swallow, it is found throughout Africa.
- H. s. filifera was first described by Stephens in 1826. Also known as the Asian wire-tailed swallow, it is found in southern and southeastern Asia.

== Gallery ==
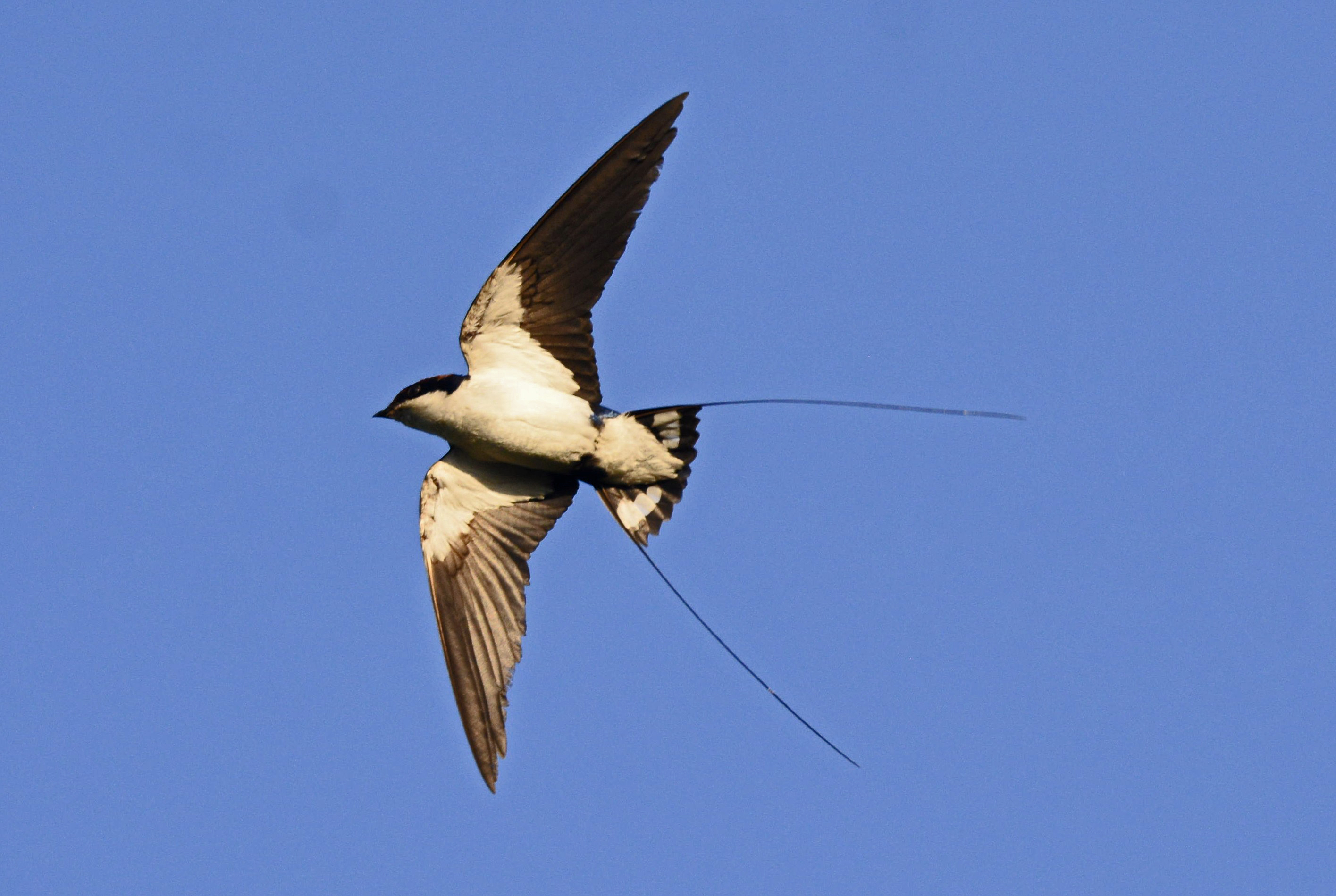
H. s. filifera

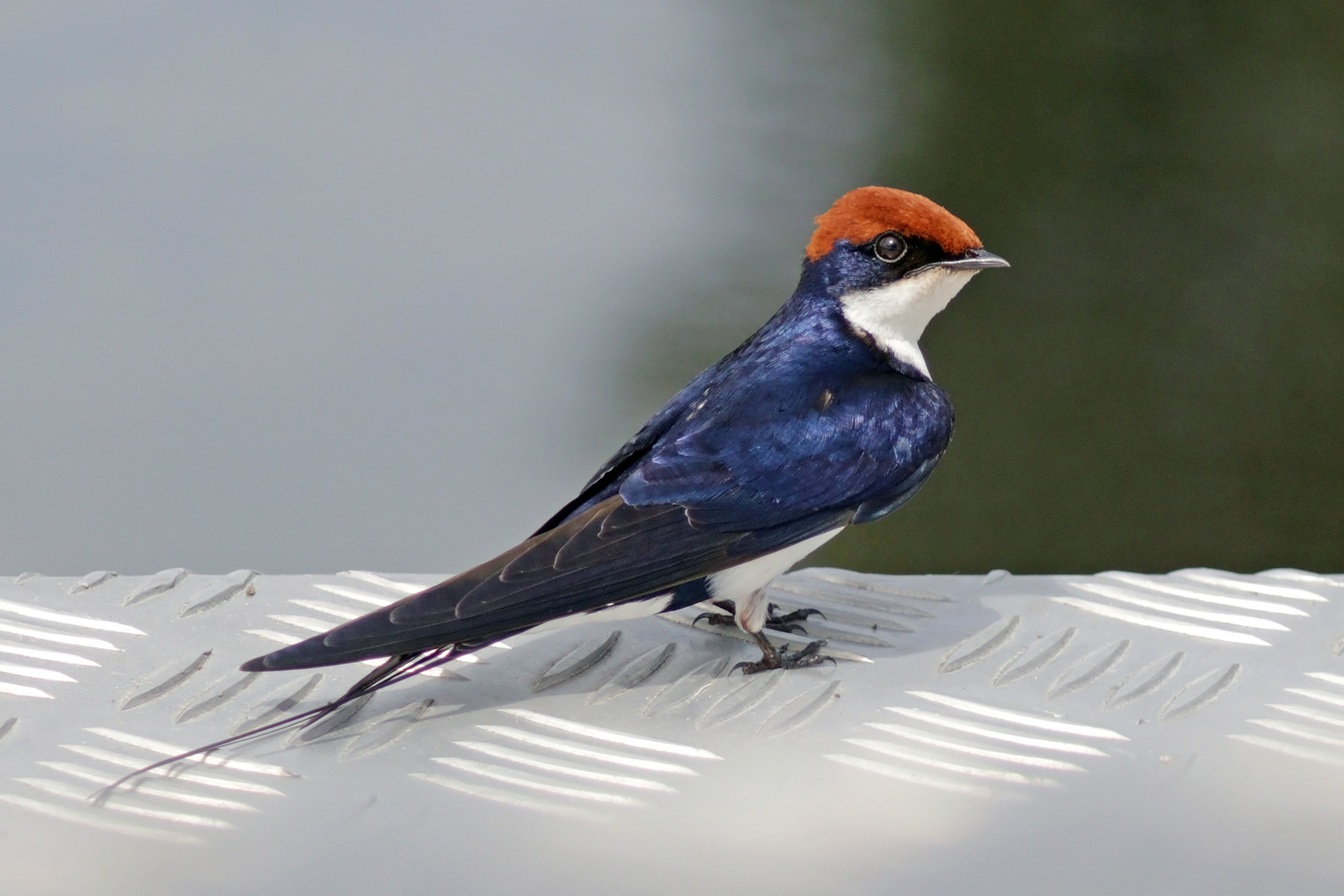
H. s. smithii, Namibia

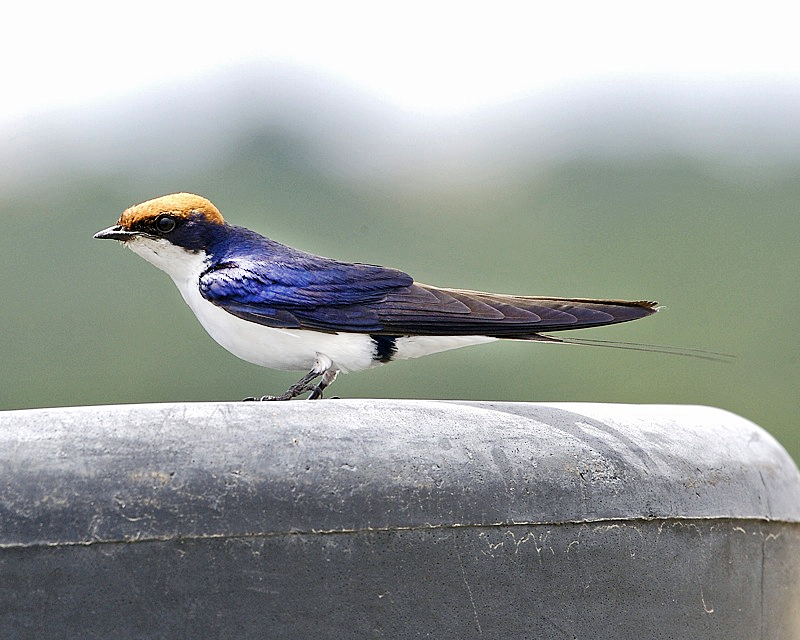
H. s. smithii in Kenya

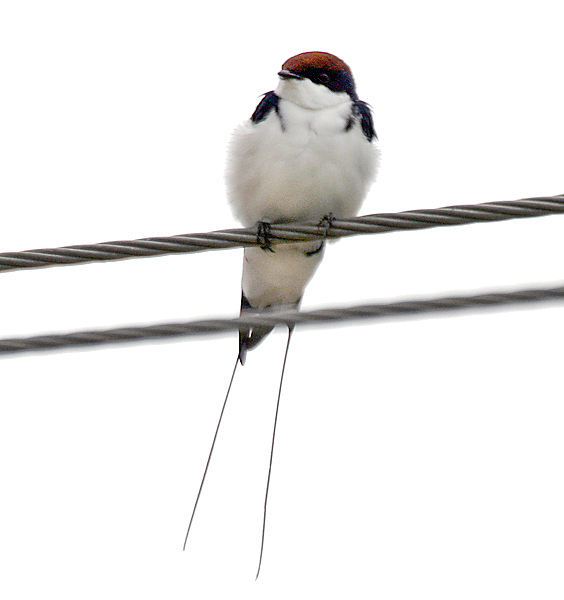
H. s. filifera at Pocharam lake, Andhra Pradesh, India

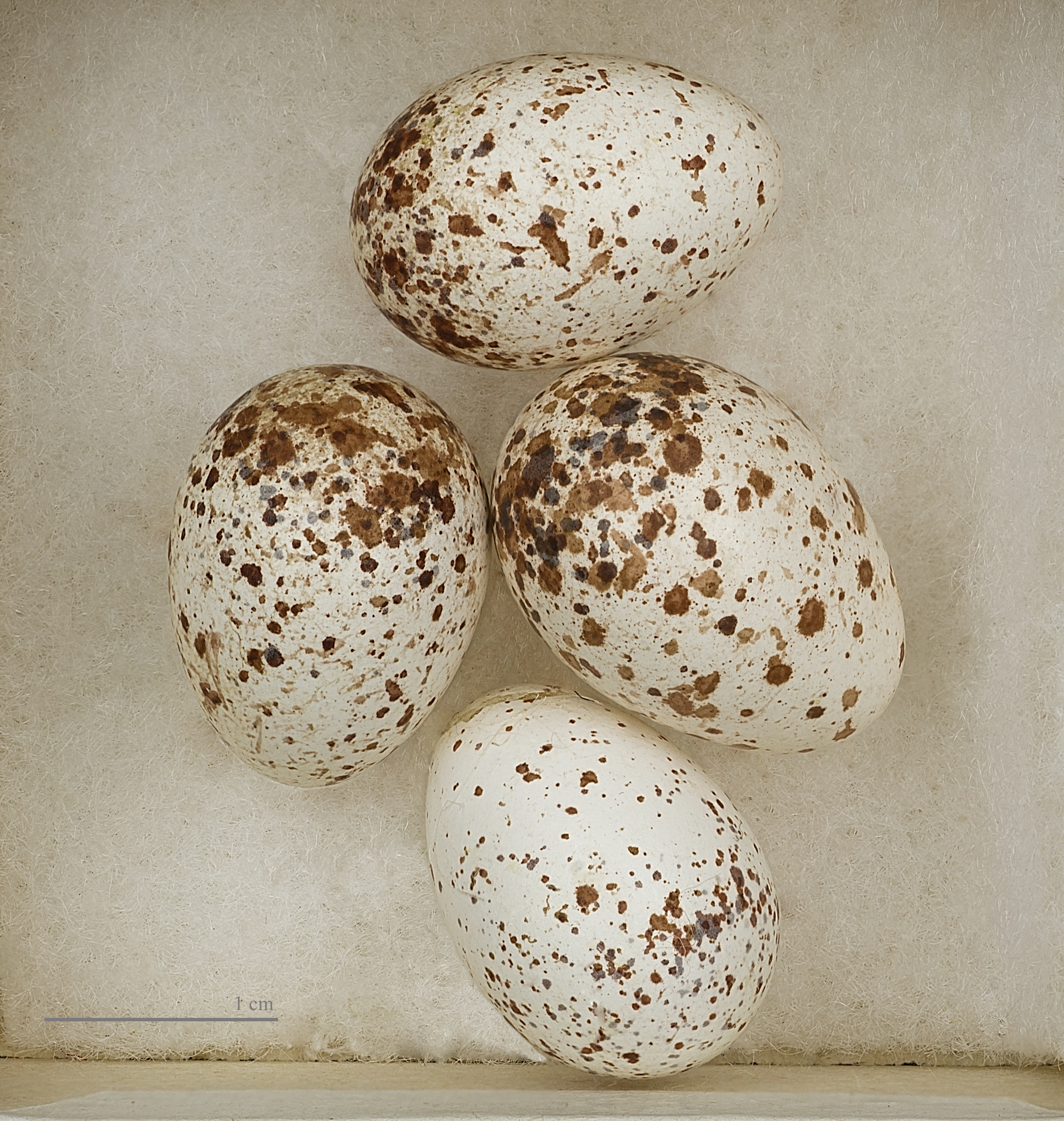
Clutch of eggs - MHNT

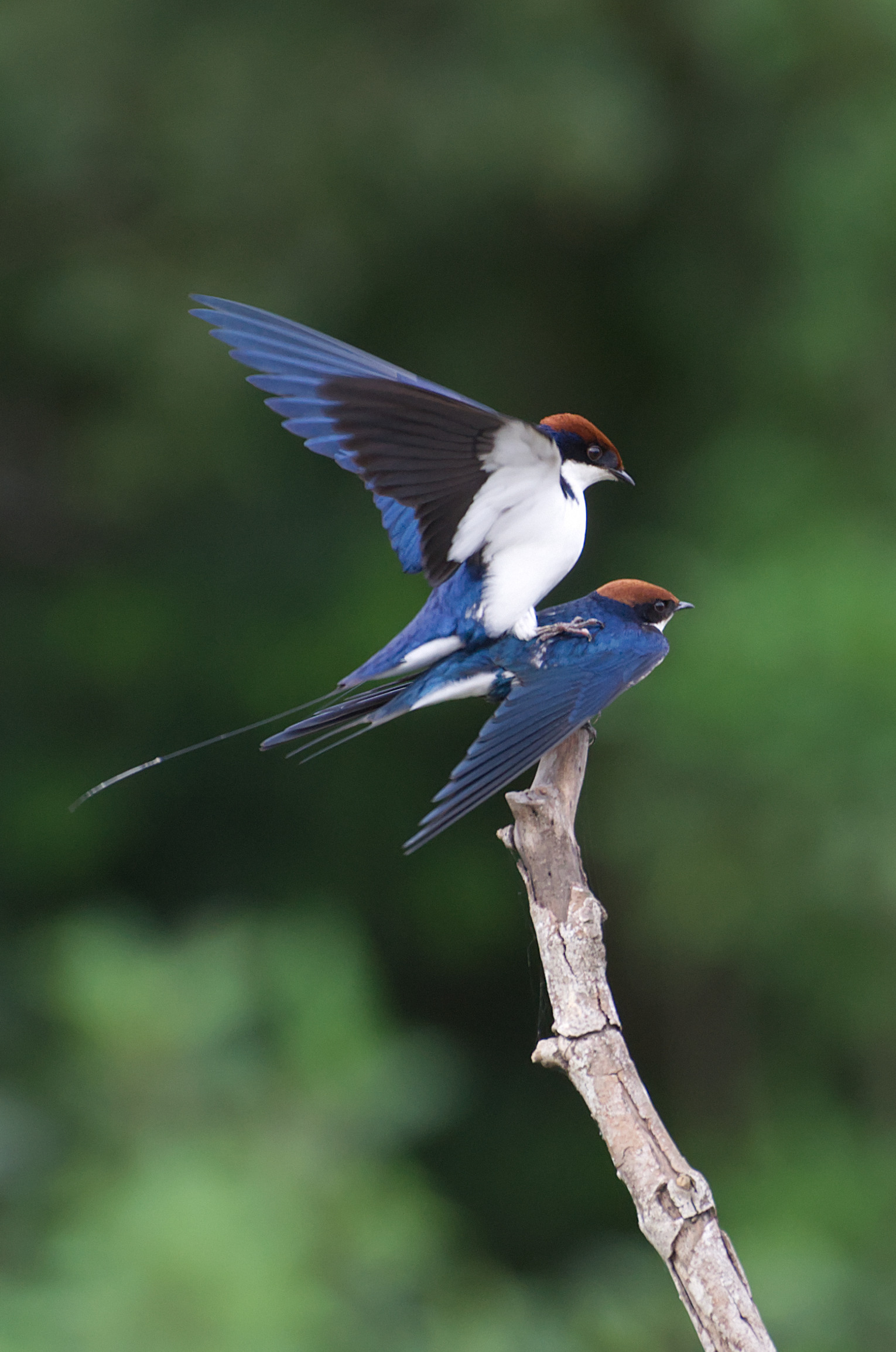
Mating
