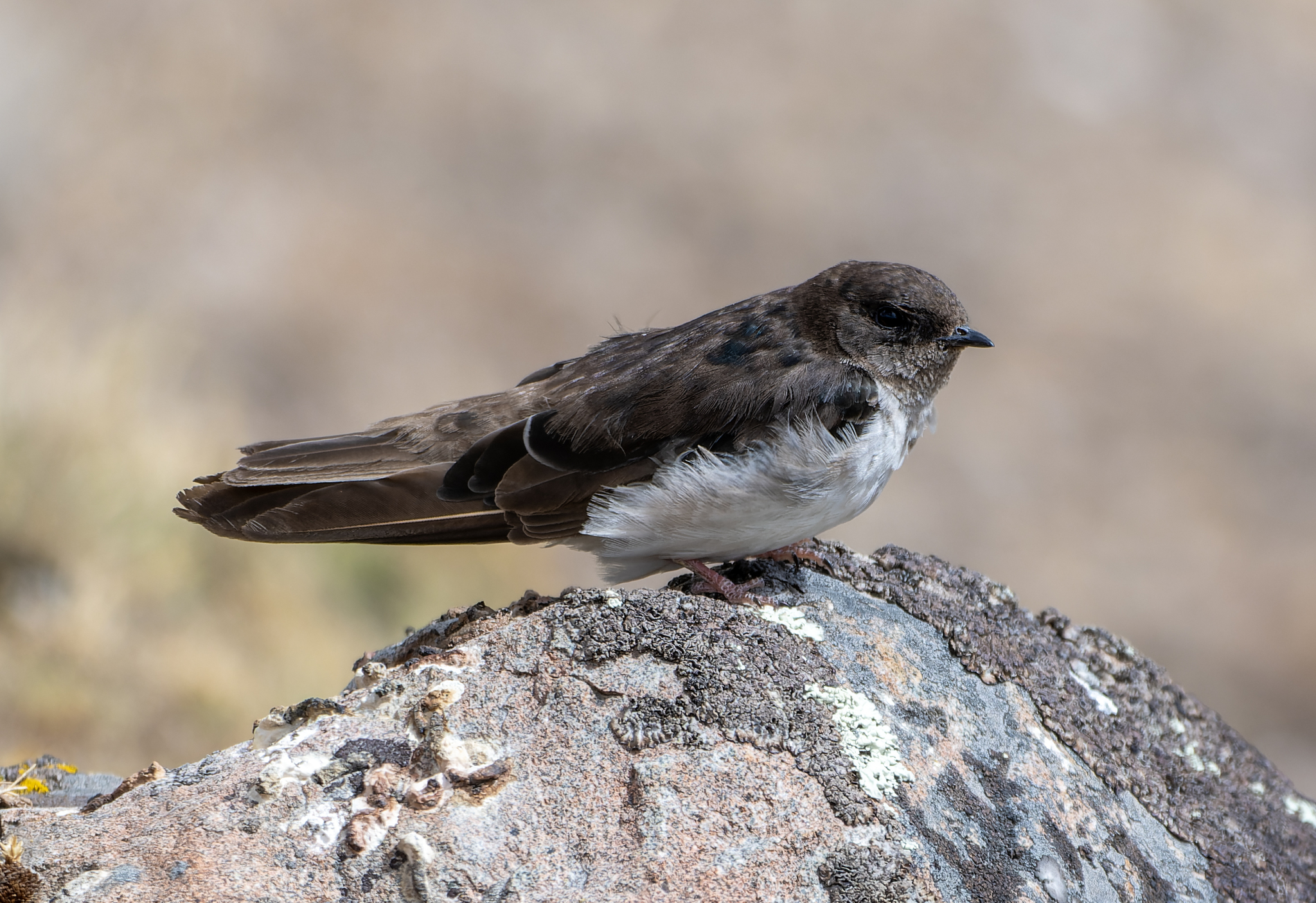

Conservation status
- Least Concern (IUCN 3.1)

Scientific classification
- Kingdom: Animalia
- Phylum: Chordata
- Class: Aves
- Order: Passeriformes
- Family: Hirundinidae
- Genus: Orochelidon
- Species: O. andecola

Binomial name
- Orochelidon andecola (D'Orbigny & Lafresnaye, 1837)

Synonyms
- See text

= Andean swallow =

Species of bird

The Andean swallow (Orochelidon andecola) is a species of bird in the family Hirundinidae, the swallows and martins. It is found in Argentina, Bolivia, Chile, and Peru.

== Taxonomy and systematics ==
The Andean swallow was originally described as Hirundo andecola. It was later assigned by different authors to genera Petrochelidon, Stelgidopteryx, and Haplochelidon. Following a study published in 2005 it was moved to the resurrected genus Orochelidon that had been erected in 1903.

The Andean swallow shares genus Oroichelidon with the pale-footed swallow (O. flavipes) and brown-bellied swallow (O. murina). It has two subspecies, the nominate O. a. andecola (D'Orbigny & Lafresnaye, 1837) and O. a. oroyae (Chapman, 1924).

== Description ==
The Andean swallow is 13.5 to 14 cm (5.3 to 5.5 in) long and weighs 14 to 19 g (0.49 to 0.67 oz). The sexes have the same plumage. Adults of the nominate subspecies have a mostly glossy greenish black head with black lores, gray ear coverts, and a gray-brown chin and throat. Their upperparts are mostly glossy greenish black with a brownish rump and uppertail coverts. Their tail is square or somewhat notched. Their breast and flanks are gray-brown and their belly and undertail coverts grayish white. Subspecies O. a. oroyae has a glossy blue-black head and upperparts. Juveniles are duller and browner than adults with pale tips on some wing feathers, a rufous-brown rump, tawny-tinged uppertail coverts, and a pale rufous wash on the belly and undertail coverts. Both subspecies have a brown iris, a black bill, and horn-colored legs and feet.

== Distribution and habitat ==
The Andean swallow is found from Ancash Department in northern Peru south through Peru into northern Chile as far as the Tarapacá Region and through western Bolivia into northwestern Argentina's Jujuy and Salta provinces. It is a bird of the altiplano, inhabiting puna grasslands and desert, tola (Parastrephia lepidophylla) heathlands, and bogs. Overall it ranges in elevation mostly between 3,100 and 4,600 m (10,200 and 15,100 ft) though there are scattered records as low as 2,500 m (8,200 ft). In Peru it is found mostly above 3,500 m (11,500 ft).

== Behavior ==
=== Movement ===
The Andean swallow is primarily a year-round resident though some movements have been noted after the breeding season.

=== Feeding ===
The Andean swallow feeds on insects captured in mid-air, though its diet is not known in detail. It typically forages in small flocks that may include other swallow species. It usually forages low over the ground with a slow, gliding, flight, though also up to about 200 m (700 ft) high. It often forages over water and around grazing animals.

=== Breeding ===
The Andean swallow's breeding season has not been fully defined but includes December to March in Bolivia, apparently September and October in Peru, and apparently September to December in Argentina. It nests in small loose colonies, in cavities such as in cliffs and earthen banks and also cavities and under eaves in human structures. It sometimes excavates or enlarges natural cavities. Its eggs are white with brown spots. The clutch size, incubation period, time to fledging, and details of parental care are not known.

=== Vocalization ===
The Andean swallow's song is "a harsh short trill or a harsh, short, dry trrrrt". Its calls are "a dry, rising dzree and a descending, slightly more musical chleep".

== Status ==
The IUCN has assessed the Andean swallow as being of Least Concern. It has a large range; its population size is not known but is believed to be stable. No immediate threats have been identified. It is considered locally common to common. "[The] Andean Swallow is not known to suffer ill effects from contact with humans, and in fact probably benefits from increased nesting opportunities provided by structures constructed by humans."
