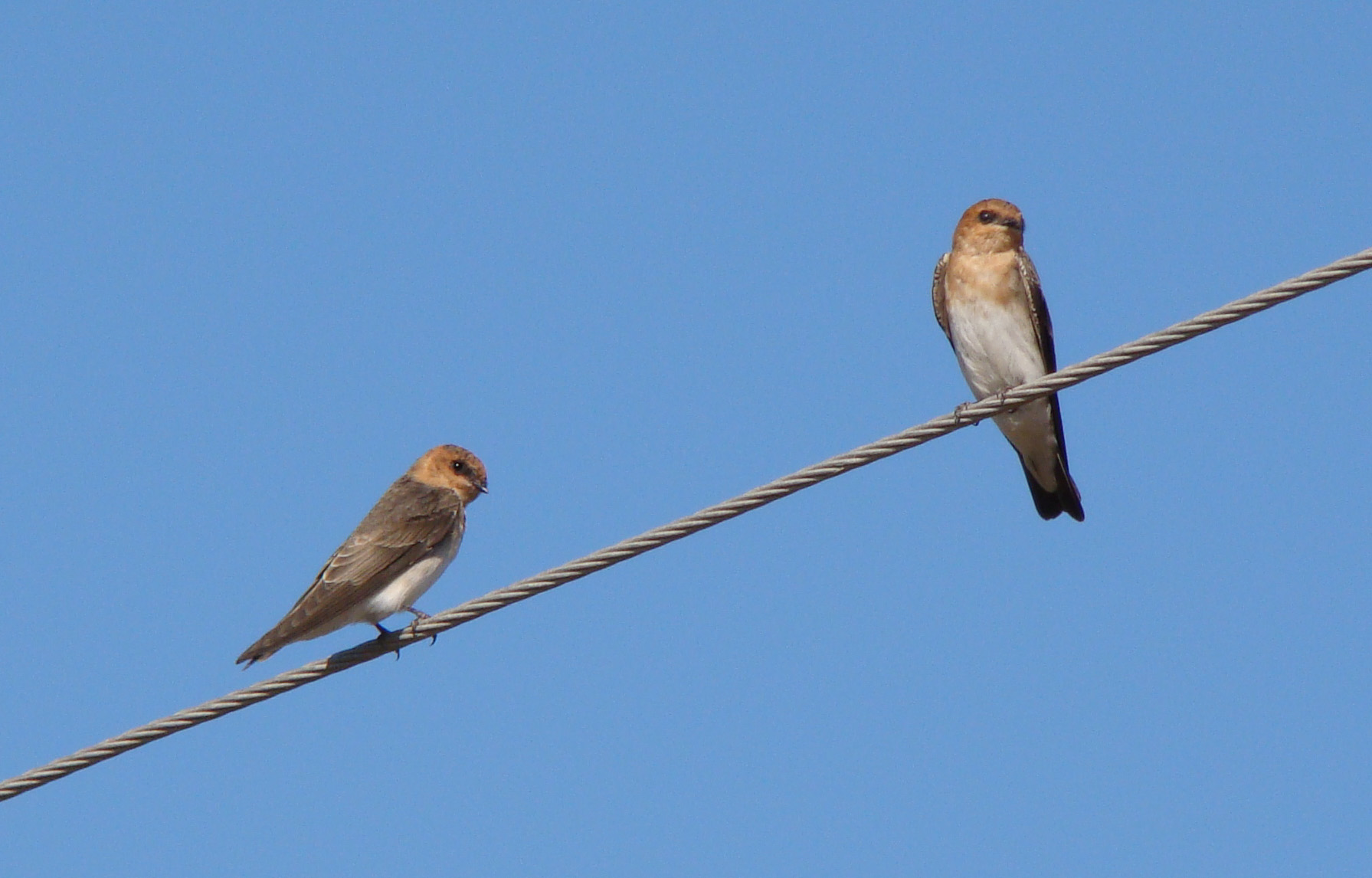
- In Rio Grande do Sul, Brazil

Conservation status
- Least Concern (IUCN 3.1)

Scientific classification
- Kingdom: Animalia
- Phylum: Chordata
- Class: Aves
- Order: Passeriformes
- Family: Hirundinidae
- Genus: Alopochelidon; Ridgway, 1903
- Species: A. fucata

Binomial name
- Alopochelidon fucata (Temminck, 1822)
- Year-round Breeding

= Tawny-headed swallow =

Species of bird

The tawny-headed swallow (Alopochelidon fucata) is a species of bird in the family Hirundinidae. It is the only species placed in the genus Alopochelidon. It is found in Argentina, Bolivia, Brazil, Colombia, Falkland Islands, Paraguay, Peru, Uruguay, and Venezuela, where its natural habitats are dry savanna and subtropical or tropical seasonally wet or flooded lowland grassland.

== Taxonomy and etymology ==
The tawny-headed swallow was formally described as Hirundo fucata by the Dutch zoologist Coenraad Temminck in 1822. The type locality is São Paulo in Brazil. The tawny-headed swallow is now the only species placed in the genus Alopochelidon that was introduced in 1903 by Robert Ridgway. The genus name combines the Ancient Greek alōpos meaning "fox-like" (alōpēx means "fox") with khelidōn meaning "swallow". The specific epithet is from Latin fucatus meaning "painted". Phylogenetic analysis has shown that tawny-headed swallow is most closely related to the swallows in the genus Orochelidon.

Although no subspecies of the tawny-headed swallow are recognised, it differs slightly depending on where it occurs. A tawny-headed swallow that occurs in the southern part of its range will usually have a duskier cap, less distinct margins of the crown feathers, and be slightly larger than those of northern populations, but birds from both the northern and southern portion of its range overlap in size and characteristics.

== Description ==
This swallow is relatively small, usually measuring 12 cm (4.7 in) and weighing 13–15 g (0.46–0.53 oz). It has a black bill that usually measures 6.6–8.1 mm (0.26–0.32 in). It has a mostly brownish-black crown, with tawny-rufous edges. It also has a tawny-rufous coloured forehead, eyebrow, and hindcrown, which transition into its cinnamon-buff ear coverts, sides of the head, throat, and breast. It has dark brown lores and brown irides. The rest of the upperparts are gray-brown, with a paler rump. The wings and almost square tail are dark brown, and the underparts are dull white with pale gray-brown sides. The juvenile can be differentiated by the fact that its head is more buff and less rufous and its feathers are tinged buff rather than rufous.

The tawny-headed swallow makes use of a flight call described as a soft trilled treeeeb.

== Distribution ==
This swallow is native to Argentina, Bolivia, Brazil, Colombia, Paraguay, Peru, Uruguay, and Venezuela and vagrant to Chile and the Falkland Islands. The tawny-headed swallow is split up into 2 resident populations, one in southeast Venezuela, and the other in central and southern Brazil, eastern Bolivia, all of Paraguay except the northwest portion of it, and northeast Argentina. It also occurs in Uruguay and part of central Argentina as a resident during the breeding season. It is not known where this population migrates, although there have been sightings of non-breeding tawny-headed swallows in eastern Colombia and southeastern Peru. This swallow can be found in open and mostly open tropical and subtropical areas, especially near small bodies of water, forest clearings near streams, and in pampas. It can also be found in wet or flooded areas of open grassland. It usually resides at altitudes up to 1,600 m (5,200 ft).

== Behaviour ==
=== Breeding ===
The nest of the tawny-headed swallow is cup-shaped and made of leaves, feathers, and straw. It usually measures 20–50 cm (7.9–20 in) in length and 7–10 cm (2.8–3.9 in) in width. The nest usually has a diameter of around 5–6 cm (2.0–2.4 in), a depth of 0.5–3 cm (0.20–1.18 in), and a height of 5–6 cm (2.0–2.4 in). The nest is constructed by both the male and female, usually over a period of 10 or 12 days. The nest can be found in hidden holes along rivers, streams, and ditches. The holes are usually at least 1 m (3.3 ft) deep, with a compartment at the end, where the nest is placed. Further research is required to determine whether this bird digs its own burrow or whether it steals tunnels from other species. The tawny-headed swallow usually nests in pairs or loose groups.

The breeding season of the northern population is suspected to occur during May and June, although it is not particularly well-known. The southern population's breeding season occurs from September to November. Other than this information, nothing is known about when its breeding season occurs.

The tawny-headed swallow, in Argentina, at least, has a clutch of four to five white eggs. The eggs measure 17 mm–19 mm × 12 mm–13.9 mm (0.67 in–0.75 in × 0.47 in–0.55 in) and weigh, on average, 1.5 g (0.053 oz).

=== Diet ===
This swallow subsists on a diet of insects, primarily beetles, flies, and hymenopterans. It usually forages in pairs and small groups, although larger groups, up to 100 individuals, have been recorded when not in the breeding season. Although it is usually not seen with other swallows, it has been seen with wintering barn swallows.
