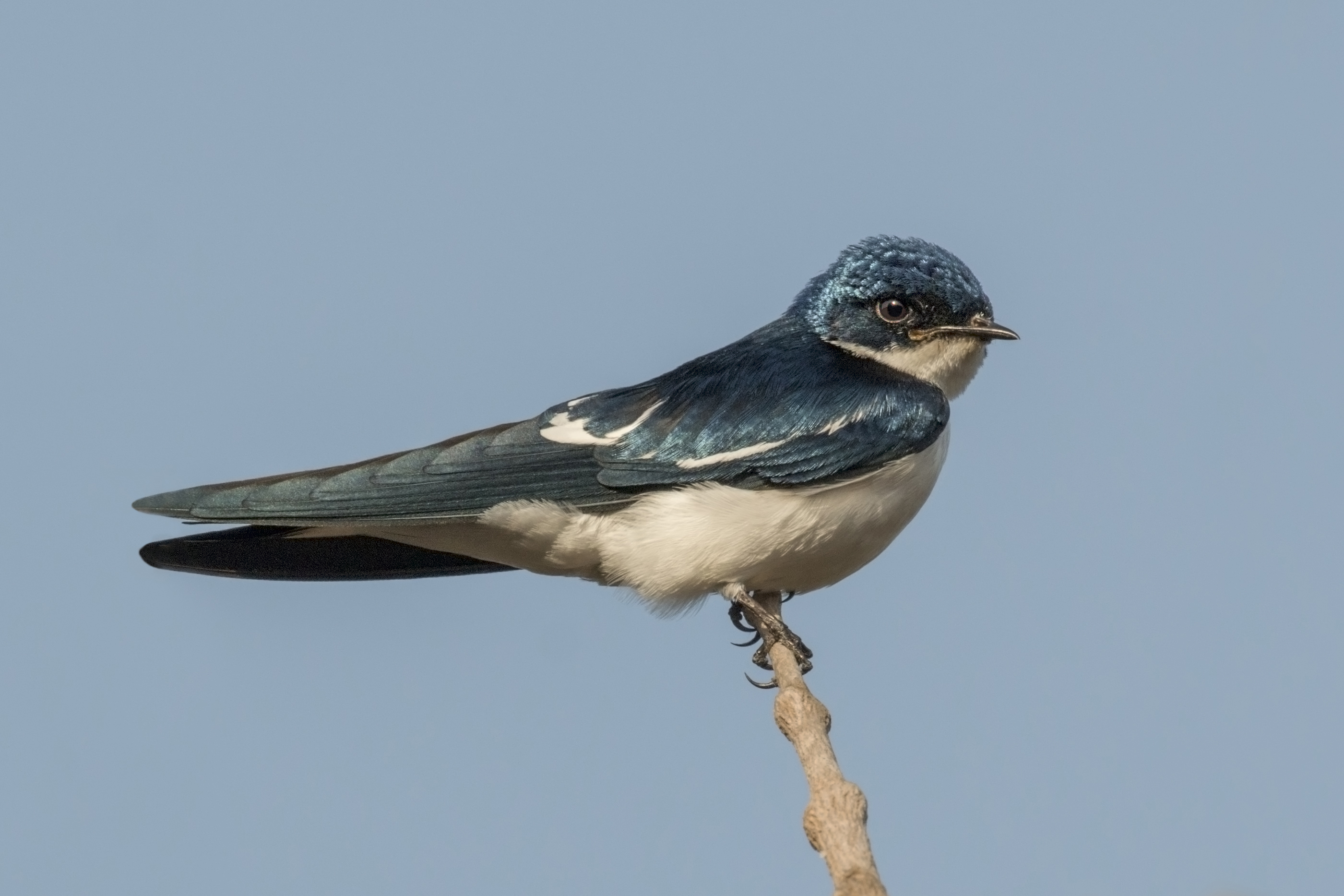
- Pied-winged swallow Hirundo leucosoma

Scientific classification
- Kingdom: Animalia
- Phylum: Chordata
- Class: Aves
- Order: Passeriformes
- Parvorder: Sylviida
- Family: Hirundinidae; Rafinesque, 1815

Genera
- 21, see text

= Swallow =

Swallow Temporal range: Early Miocene to present

Family of songbirds

The swallows, martins, and saw-wings, or Hirundinidae, are a family of passerine songbirds found around the world on all continents, including occasionally in Antarctica. Highly adapted to aerial feeding, they have a distinctive appearance. The term "swallow" is used as the common name for Hirundo rustica in the United Kingdom and Ireland. Around 90 species of Hirundinidae are known, divided into 21 genera, with the greatest diversity found in Africa, which is also thought to be where they evolved as hole-nesters. They also occur on a number of oceanic islands. A number of European and North American species are long-distance migrants; by contrast, the West and South African swallows are nonmigratory.

This family comprises two subfamilies: Pseudochelidoninae (the river martins of the genus Pseudochelidon) and Hirundininae (all other swallows, martins, and saw-wings). In the Old World, the name "martin" tends to be used for the squarer-tailed species, and the name "swallow" for the more fork-tailed species; however, this distinction does not represent a real evolutionary separation. In the New World, "martin" is reserved for members of the genus Progne. (These two systems are responsible for the same species being called sand martin in the Old World and bank swallow in the New World.)

== Taxonomy and systematics ==
The family Hirundinidae was introduced (as Hirundia) by the French polymath Constantine Samuel Rafinesque in 1815. The Hirundinidae are morphologically unique within the passerines, with molecular evidence placing them as a distinctive lineage within the Sylvioidea (Old World warblers and relatives). Phylogenetic analysis has shown that the family Hirundinidae is sister to the cupwings in the family Pnoepygidae. The two families diverged in the early Miocene around 22 million years ago.

Within the family, a clear division exists between the two subfamilies, the Pseudochelidoninae, which are composed of the two species of river martins, and the Hirundininae, into which the remaining species are placed. The division of the Hirundininae has been the source of much discussion, with various taxonomists variously splitting them into as many as 24 genera and lumping them into just 12. Some agreement exists that three core groups occur within the Hirundininae: the saw-wings of the genus Psalidoprocne, the core martins, and the swallows of the genus Hirundo and their allies. The saw-wings are the most basal of the three, with the other two clades being sister to each other. The phylogeny of the swallows is closely related to evolution of nest construction; the more basal saw-wings use burrows as nest, the core martins have both burrowing (in the Old World members) and cavity adoption (in New World members) as strategies, and the genus Hirundo and its allies use mud nests.

The genus level cladogram shown below is based on a molecular phylogenetic study by Drew Schield and collaborators that was published in 2024. The choice of genera and the number of species is taken from the list of birds maintained by Frank Gill, Pamela C. Rasmussen and David Donsker on behalf of the International Ornithological Committee (IOC).

- Hirundinidae
  - - Pseudochelidoninae
      Pseudochelidon – river martins (2 species)
    - Hirundininae
      - Psalidoprocne – saw-wings (5 species)
      - - mud nesters
          - - Ptyonoprogne – crag martins (5 species)
            - Hirundo – swallows (16 species)
          - - - Atronanus – forest swallow
              - Delichon – house martins (4 species)
            - - Petrochelidon – includes cliff swallows (10 species)
              - Cecropis – swallows (9 species)
        - - - Pseudhirundo – grey-rumped swallow
            - Cheramoeca – white-backed swallow
          - - - Phedina – Mascarene martin
              - - Neophedina – banded martin
                - Phedinopsis – Brazza's martin
            - - Riparia – martins (6 species)
              - New World endemics
                - Tachycineta – swallows (9 species)
                - - Progne – martins (9 species)
                  - - Stelgidopteryx – rough-winged swallows (2 species)
                    - - Atticora – swallows (3 species)
                      - - Pygochelidon – swallows (2 species)
                        - - Alopochelidon – tawny-headed swallow
                          - Orochelidon – swallows (3 species)

=== Fossil record ===
The oldest known fossil swallow is Miochelidon eschata from the Early Miocene of Siberia; it is the only record of Hirundinidae from the Miocene. It is likely a basal member of the family.

== Description ==
The Hirundinidae have an evolutionarily conservative body shape, which is similar across the clade, but is unlike that of other passerines. Swallows have adapted to hunting insects on the wind by developing a slender, streamlined body and long, pointed wings, which allow great maneuverability and endurance, as well as frequent periods of gliding. Their body shapes allow for very efficient flight; the metabolic rate of swallows in flight is 49–72% lower than equivalent passerines of the same size.

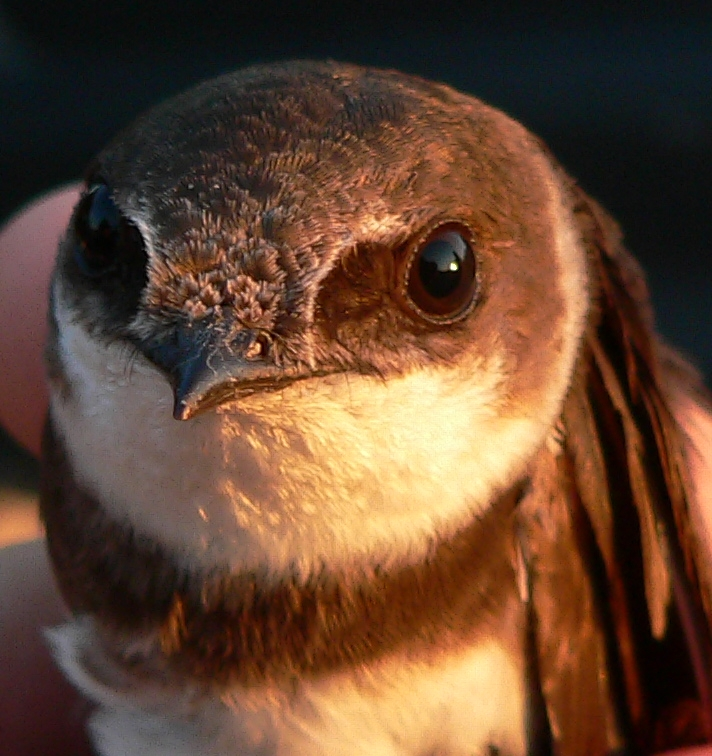
The bill of the sand martin is typical for the family, being short and wide.

Swallows have two foveae in each eye, giving them sharp lateral and frontal vision to help track prey. They also have relatively long eyes, with their length almost equaling their width. The long eyes allow for an increase in visual acuity without competing with the brain for space inside of the head. The morphology of the eye in swallows is similar to that of a raptor.

Like the unrelated swifts and nightjars, which hunt in a similar way, they have short bills, but strong jaws and a wide gape. Their body lengths range from about 10–24 cm (3.9–9.4 in) and their weight from about 10–60 g (0.35–2.12 oz). The smallest species by weight may be the Fanti sawwing, at a mean body mass of 9.4 g (0.33 oz) while the purple martin and southern martin, which both weigh in excess of 50 g (1.8 oz) on average, rival one another as the heaviest swallows. The wings are long, pointed, and have nine primary feathers. The tail has 12 feathers and may be deeply forked, somewhat indented, or square-ended. A long tail increases maneuverability, and may also function as a sexual adornment, since the tail is frequently longer in males. In barn swallows, the tail of the male is 18% longer than those of the female, and females select mates on the basis of tail length.

Their legs are short, and their feet are adapted for perching rather than walking, as the front toes are partially joined at the base. Swallows are capable of walking and even running, but they do so with a shuffling, waddling gait. The leg muscles of the river martins (Pseudochelidon) are stronger and more robust than those of other swallows. The river martins have other characteristics that separate them from the other swallows. The structure of the syrinx is substantially different between the two subfamilies; and in most swallows, the bill, legs, and feet are dark brown or black, but in the river martins, the bill is orange-red and the legs and feet are pink.

The most common hirundine plumage is glossy dark blue or green above and plain or streaked underparts, often white or rufous. Species that burrow or live in dry or mountainous areas are often matte brown above (e.g. sand martin and crag martin). The sexes show limited or no sexual dimorphism, with longer outer tail feathers in the adult male probably being the most common distinction.

The chicks hatch naked and with closed eyes. Fledged juveniles usually appear as duller versions of the adult.

== Distribution and habitat ==
The family has a worldwide cosmopolitan distribution, breeding on every continent except Antarctica. Two species, the Tahiti swallow and Pacific swallow, occur as a breeding birds on a number of oceanic islands in the Pacific Ocean, the Mascarene martin breeds on Reunion and Mauritius in the Indian Ocean, and a number of migratory species are common vagrants to other isolated islands and even to some sub-Antarctic islands and Antarctica. Many species have enormous worldwide ranges, particularly the barn swallow, which breeds over most of the Northern Hemisphere and winters over most of the Southern Hemisphere.

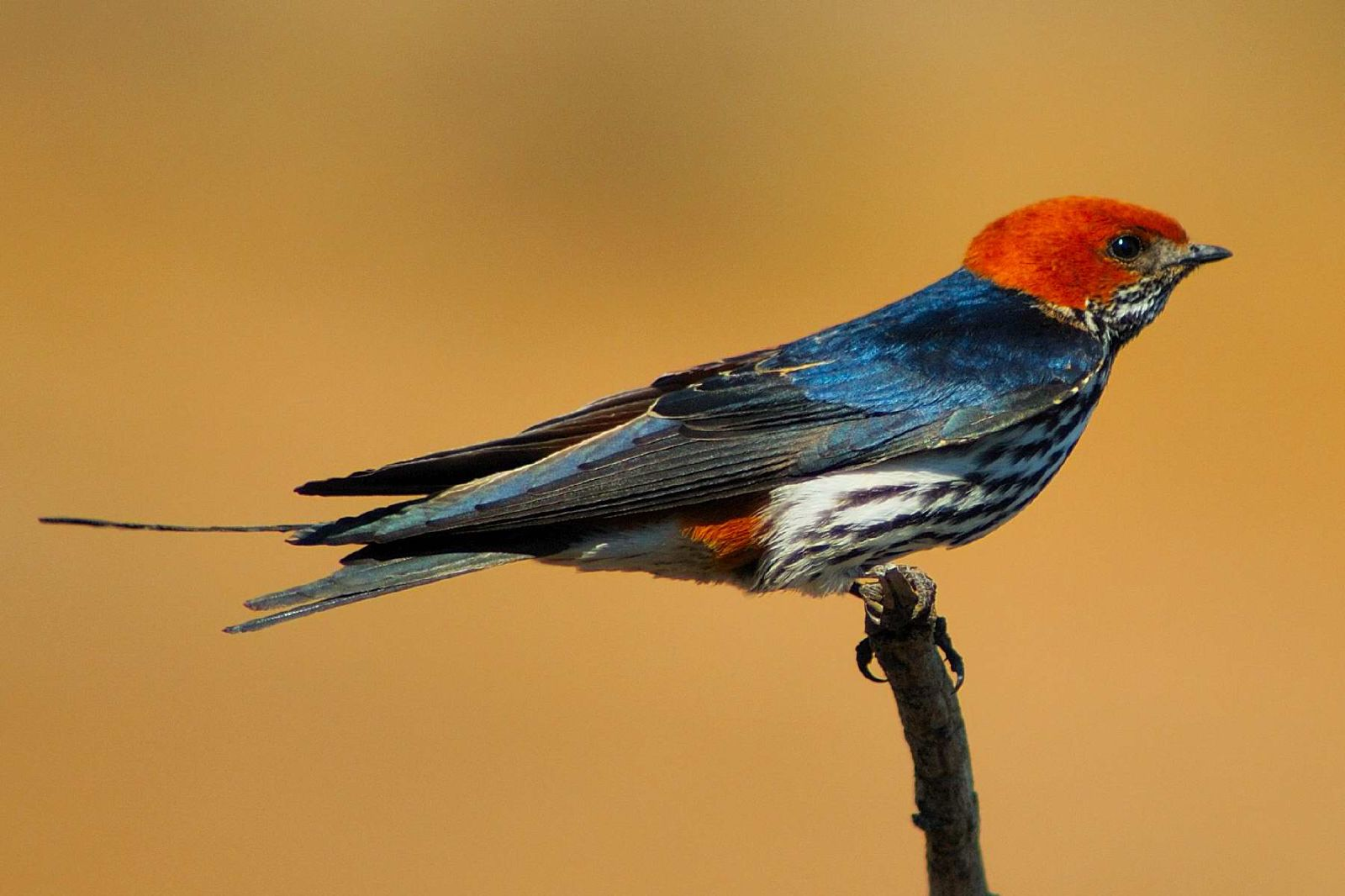
The lesser striped swallow is a partial migrant within Africa.

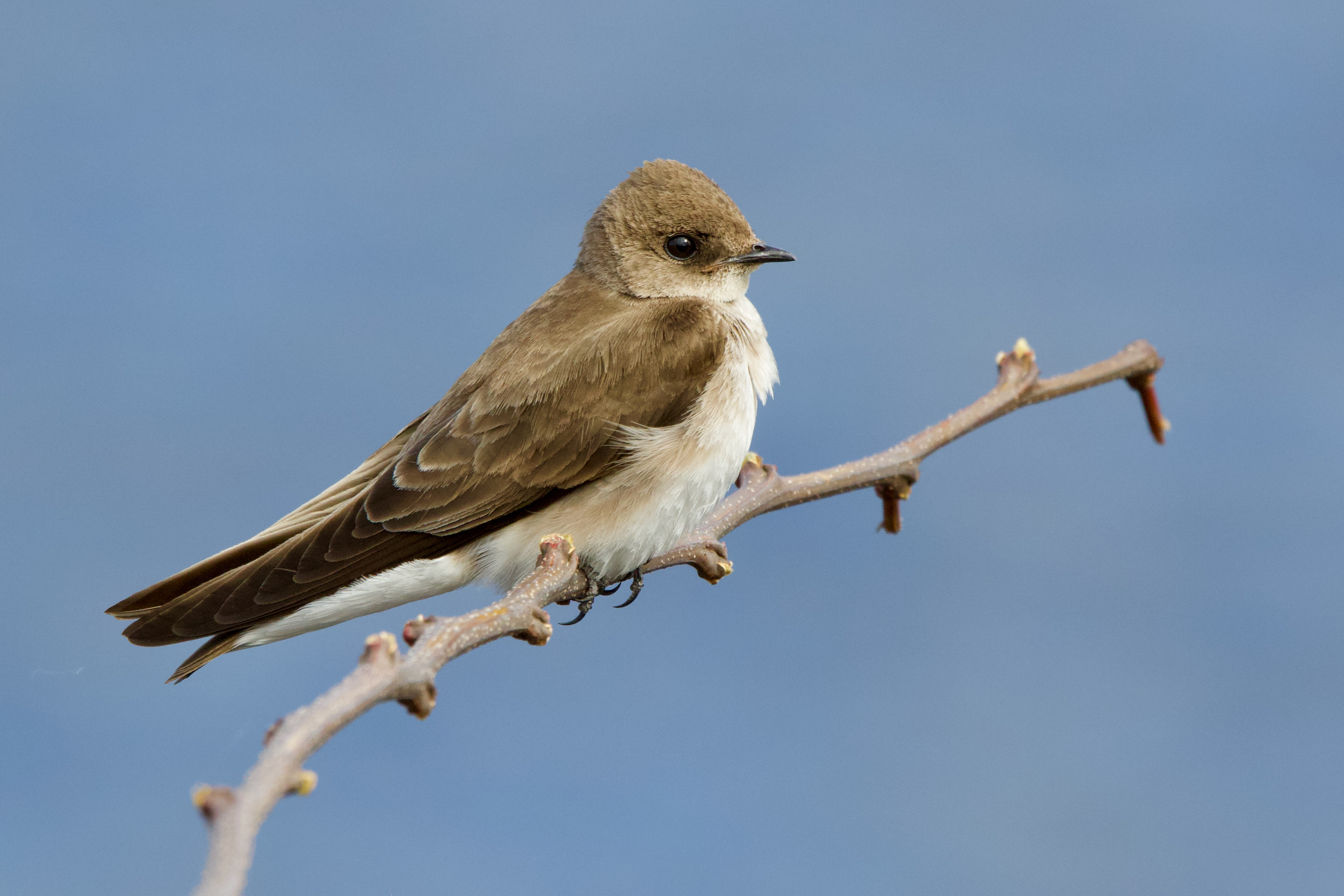
A northern rough-winged swallow photographed in central Maine, the northeastern limit of the species' breeding range.

The family uses a wide range of habitats. They are dependent on flying insects, and as these are common over waterways and lakes, they frequently feed over these, but they can be found in any open habitat, including grasslands, open woodland, savanna, marshes, mangroves, and scrubland, from sea level to high alpine areas. Many species inhabit human-altered landscapes, including agricultural land and even urban areas. Land-use changes have also caused some species to expand their range, most impressively the welcome swallow, which began to colonise New Zealand in the 1920s, started breeding in the 1950s, and is now a common landbird there.

Species breeding in temperate regions migrate during the winter when their insect prey populations collapse. Species breeding in more tropical areas are often more sedentary, although several tropical species are partial migrants or make shorter migrations. In antiquity, swallows were thought to have hibernated in a state of torpor, or even that they withdrew for the winter under water. Aristotle ascribed hibernation not only to swallows, but also to storks and kites. Hibernation of swallows was considered a possibility even by as acute an observer as Rev. Gilbert White, in his The Natural History and Antiquities of Selborne (1789, based on decades of observations). This idea may have been supported by the habit of some species to roost in some numbers in dovecotes, nests and other forms of shelter during harsh weather, and some species even entering torpor. There were several reports of suspected torpor in swallows from 1947, such as a 1970 report that white-backed swallows in Australia may conserve energy this way, but the first confirmed study that they or any passerine entered torpor was a 1988 study on house martins.

== Behaviour and ecology ==
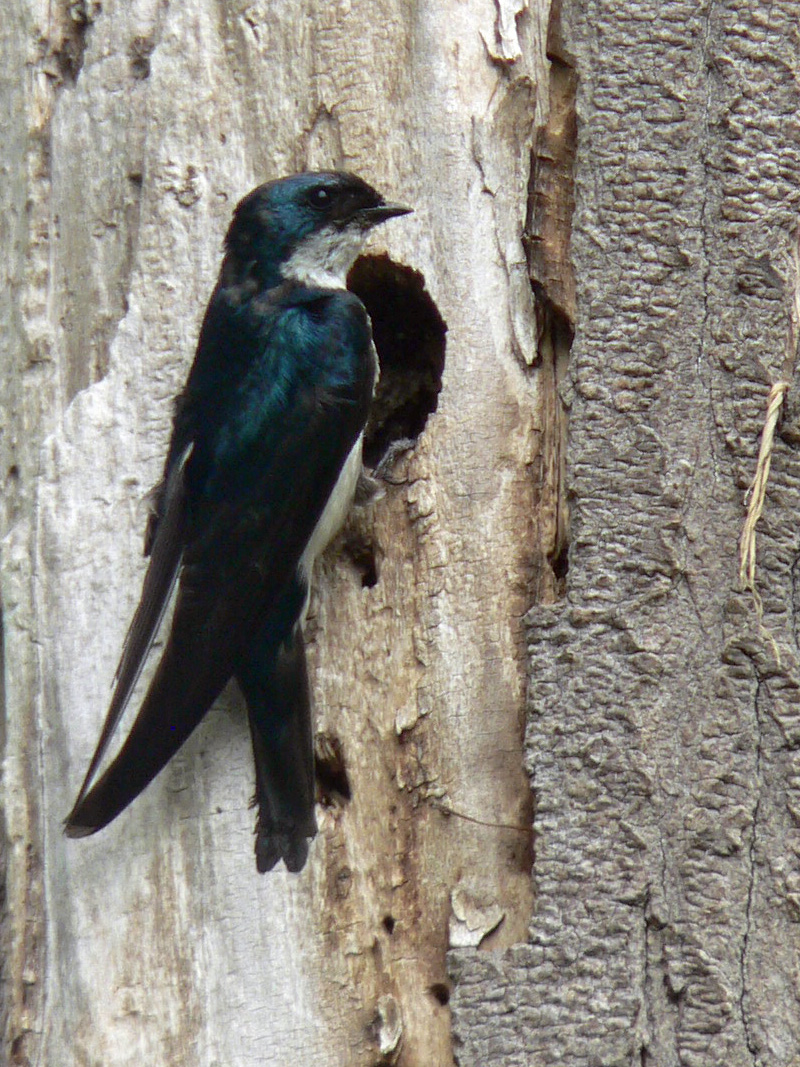
A tree swallow attending its nest in a tree cavity

Swallows are excellent flyers and use these skills to feed and attract mates. Some species, such as the mangrove swallow, are territorial, whereas others are not and simply defend their nesting sites. In general, the male selects a nest site, and then attracts a female using song and flight and (dependent on the species) guards his territory. The size of the territory varies depending on the species of swallow; in colonial-nesting species, it tends to be small, but it may be much larger for solitary nesters. Outside the breeding season, some species may form large flocks, and species may also roost communally. This is thought to provide protection from predators, such as sparrowhawks and hobbies. These roosts can be enormous; one winter-roosting site of barn swallows in Nigeria attracted 1.5 million individuals. Nonsocial species do not form flocks, but recently fledged chicks may remain with their parents for a while after the breeding season. If a human being gets too close to their territory, swallows attack them within the perimeter of the nest. Colonial species may mob predators and humans that are too close to the colony.

=== Diet and feeding ===
For the most part, swallows are insectivorous, taking flying insects on the wing. Across the whole family, a wide range of insects is taken from most insect groups, but the composition of any one prey type in the diet varies by species and with the time of year. Individual species may be selective; they do not scoop up every insect around them, but instead select larger prey items than would be expected by random sampling. In addition, the ease of capture of different insect types affects their rate of predation by swallows. They also avoid certain prey types; in particular, stinging insects such as bees and wasps are generally avoided. In addition to insect prey, a number of species occasionally consume fruits and other plant matter. Species in Africa have been recorded eating the seeds of Acacia trees, and these are even fed to the young of the greater striped swallow.

The swallows generally forage for prey on the wing, but they on occasion snap prey off branches or on the ground. The flight may be fast and involve a rapid succession of turns and banks when actively chasing fast-moving prey; less agile prey may be caught with a slower, more leisurely flight that includes flying in circles and bursts of flapping mixed with gliding. Where several species of swallows feed together, they separate into different niches based on height off the ground, some species feeding closer to the ground and others feeding at higher levels. Similar separation occurs where feeding overlaps with swifts. Niche separation may also occur with the size of prey chosen.

=== Breeding ===
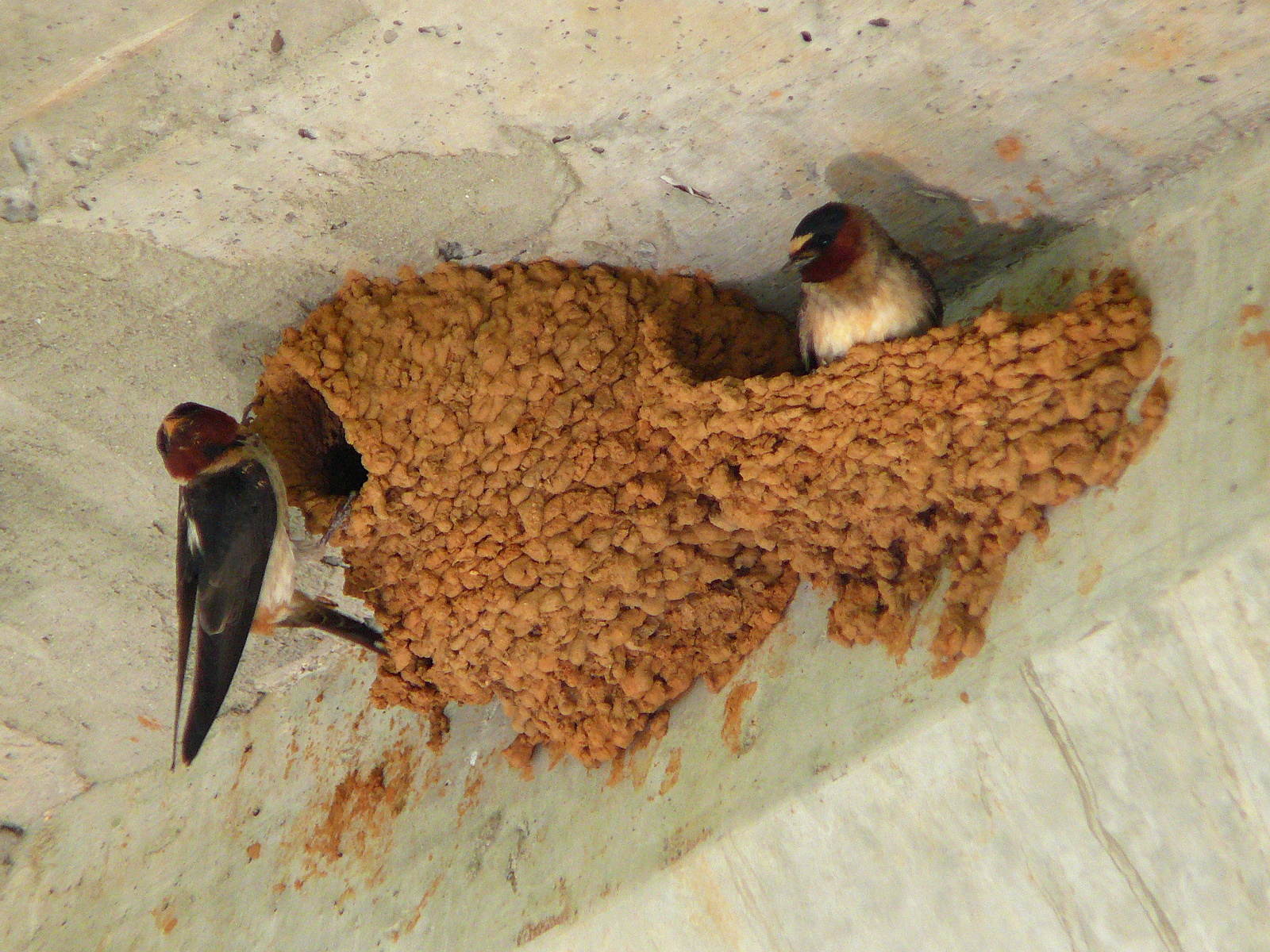
Two American cliff swallows constructing mud nests

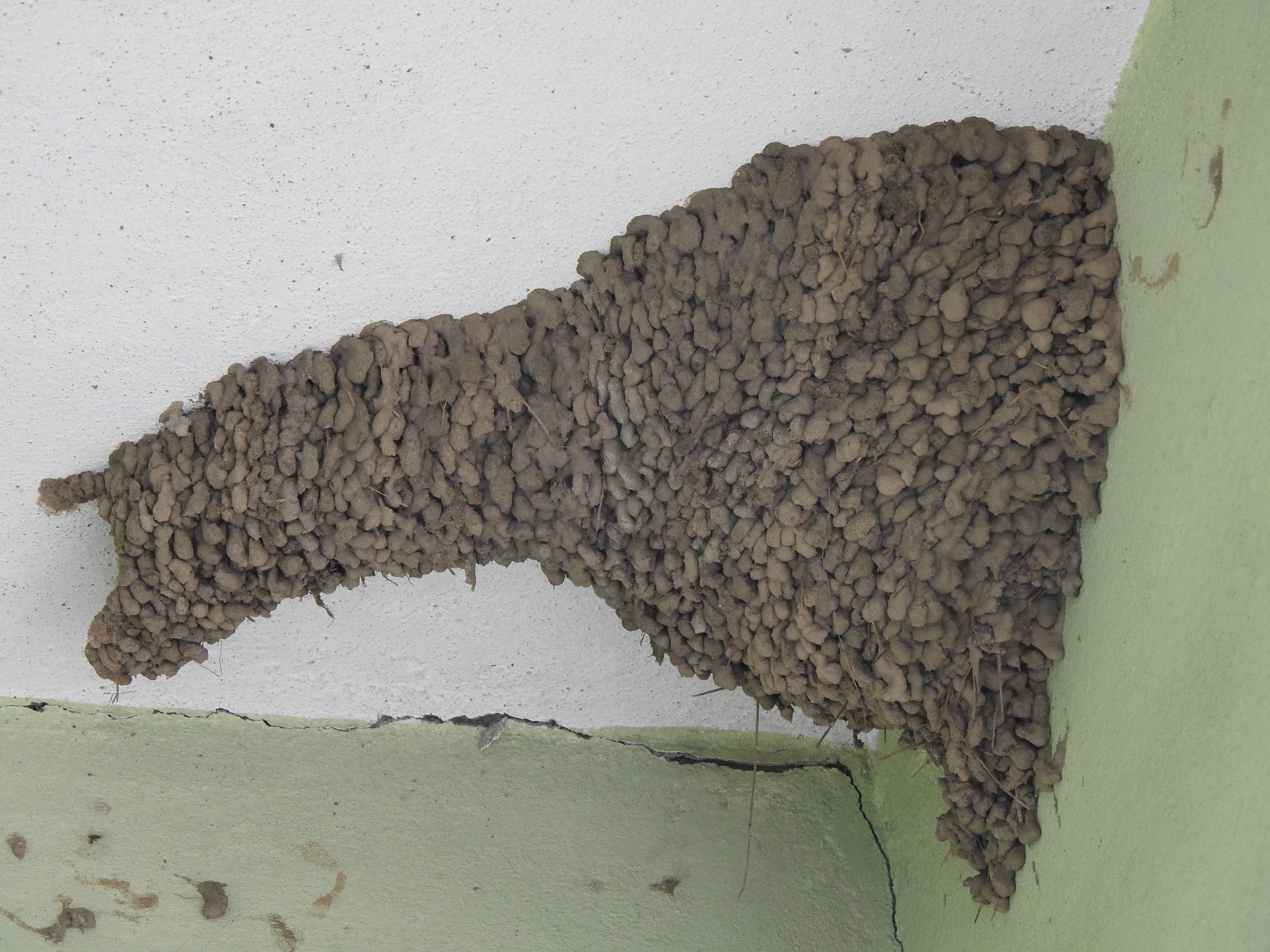
Eastern red-rumped swallow nest being built for breeding in a countryside building's verandha, Himachal Pradesh, India

The more primitive species nest in existing cavities, for example in an old woodpecker nest, while other species excavate burrows in soft substrate such as sand banks. Swallows in the genera Hirundo, Ptyonoprogne, Cecropis, Petrochelidon, Atronanus and Delichon build mud nests close to overhead shelter in locations that are protected from both the weather and predators. The mud-nesters are most common in the Old World, particularly Africa, whereas cavity-nesters are more common in the New World. Mud-nesting species in particular are limited in areas of high humidity, which causes the mud nests to crumble. Many cave-, bank-, and cliff-dwelling species of swallows nest in large colonies. Mud nests are constructed by both males and females, and amongst the tunnel diggers, the excavation duties are shared, as well. In historical times, the introduction of man-made stone structures such as barns and bridges, together with forest clearance, has led to an abundance of colony sites around the globe, significantly increasing the breeding ranges of some species. Birds living in large colonies typically have to contend with both ectoparasites and conspecific nest parasitism. In barn swallows, old mated males and young unmated males benefit from colonial behaviour, whereas females and mated young males likely benefit more from nesting by themselves.

Pairs of mated swallows are monogamous, and pairs of nonmigratory species often stay near their breeding area all year, though the nest site is defended most vigorously during the breeding season. Migratory species often return to the same breeding area each year, and may select the same nest site if they were previously successful in that location. First-year breeders generally select a nesting site close to where they were raised. The breeding of temperate species is seasonal, whereas that of subtropical or tropical species can either be continuous throughout the year or seasonal. Seasonal species in the subtropics or tropics usually time their breeding to coincide with the peaks in insect activity, which is usually the wet season, but some species, such as the white-bibbed swallow, nest in the dry season to avoid flooding in their riverbank nesting habitat. All swallows defend their nests from egg predators, although solitary species are more aggressive towards predators than colonial species. Overall, the contribution of male swallows towards parental care is the highest of any passerine bird.

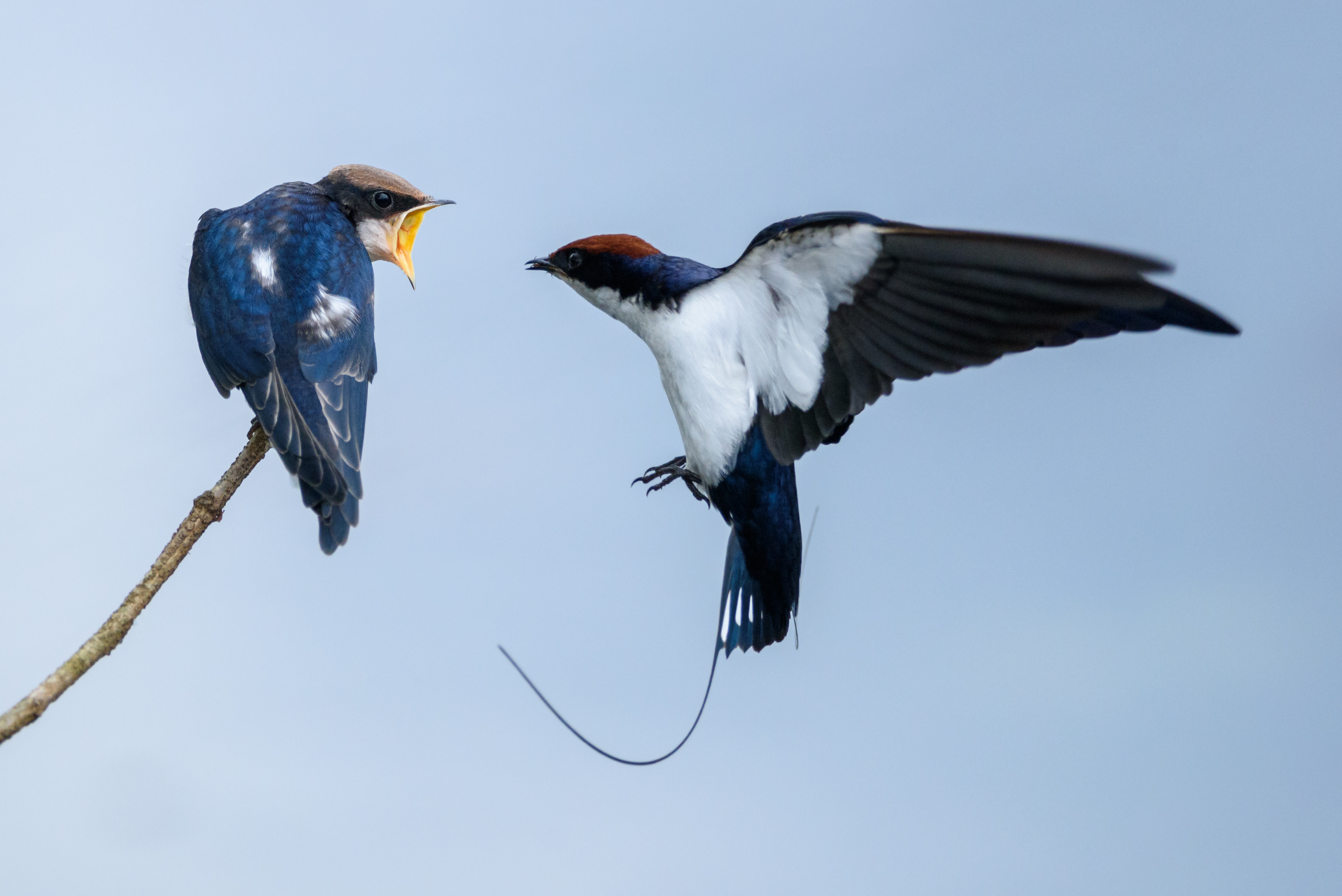
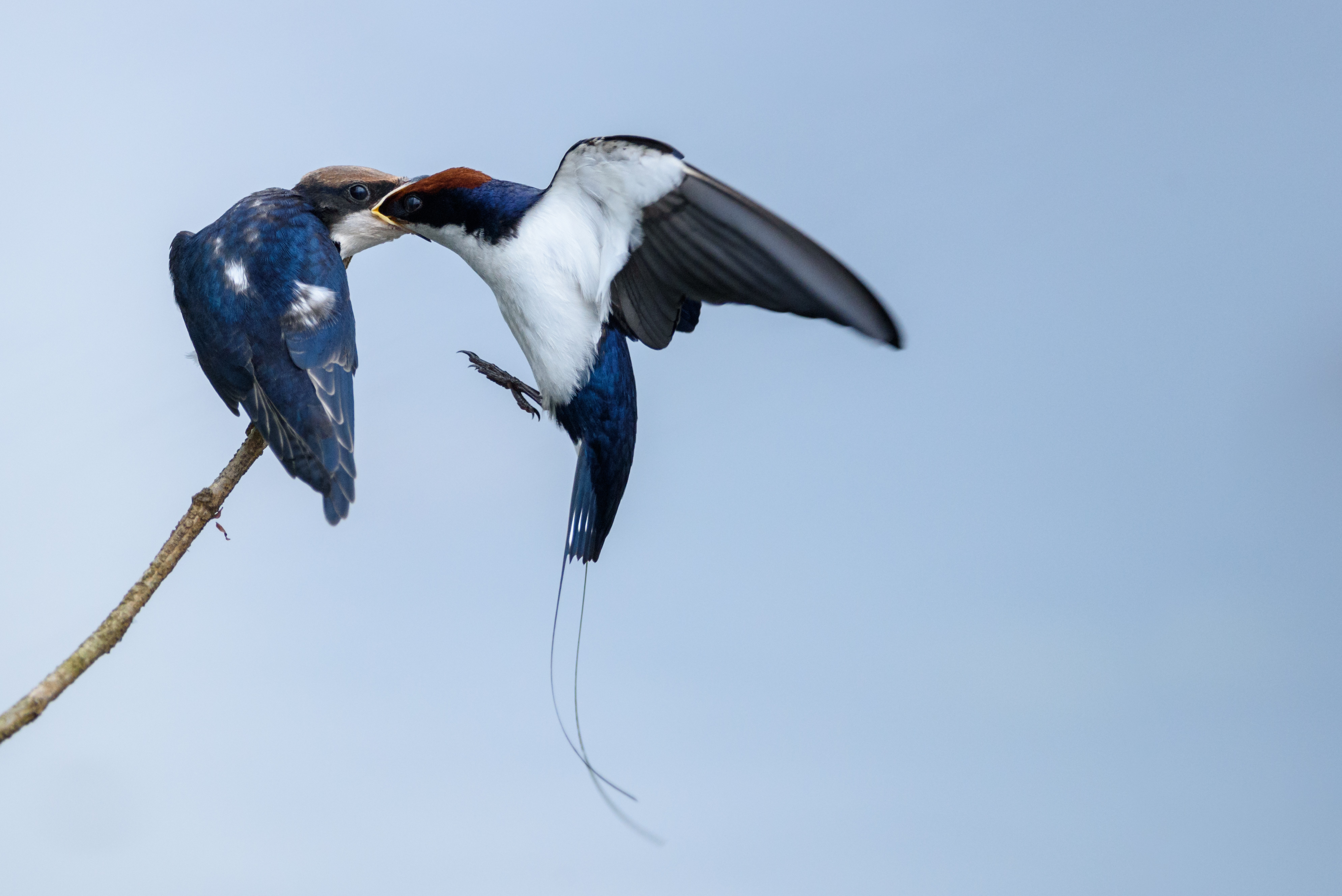
A wire-tailed swallow feeding a recently fledged chick

The eggs of swallows tend to be white, although those of some mud-nesters are speckled. The typical clutch size is around four to five eggs in temperate areas and two to three eggs in the tropics. The incubation duties are shared in some species, and in others the eggs are incubated solely by the females. Amongst the species where the males help with incubation, their contribution varies amongst species, with some species such as the cliff swallow sharing the duties equally and the female doing most of the work in others. Amongst the barn swallows, the male of the American subspecies helps (to a small extent), whereas the European subspecies does not. Even in species where the male does not incubate the eggs, he may sit on them when the female is away to reduce heat loss (this is different from incubation as that involves warming the eggs, not just stopping heat loss). Incubation stints last for 5–15 minutes and are followed by bursts of feeding activity. From laying, swallow eggs take 10–21 days to hatch, with 14–18 days being more typical.

The chicks of swallows hatch naked, generally with only a few tufts of down. The eyes are closed and do not fully open for up to 10 days. The feathers take a few days to begin to sprout, and the chicks are brooded by the parents until they are able to thermoregulate. On the whole, they develop slowly compared to other passerine birds. The parents do not usually feed the chicks individual insects, but instead feed a bolus of food comprising 10–100 insects. Regardless of whether the species has males that incubate or brood the chicks, the males of all hirundines help feed the chicks. When the young fledge is difficult to determine, as they are enticed out of the nest after three weeks by parents, but frequently return to the nest afterwards to roost.

=== Calls ===
Song of the purple martin.

Swallows are able to produce many different calls or songs, which are used to express excitement, to communicate with others of the same species, during courtship, or as an alarm when a predator is in the area. The songs of males are related to the body condition of the bird and are presumably used by females to judge the physical condition and suitability for mating of males. Begging calls are used by the young when soliciting food from their parents. The typical song of swallows is a simple, sometimes musical twittering.

== Status and conservation ==
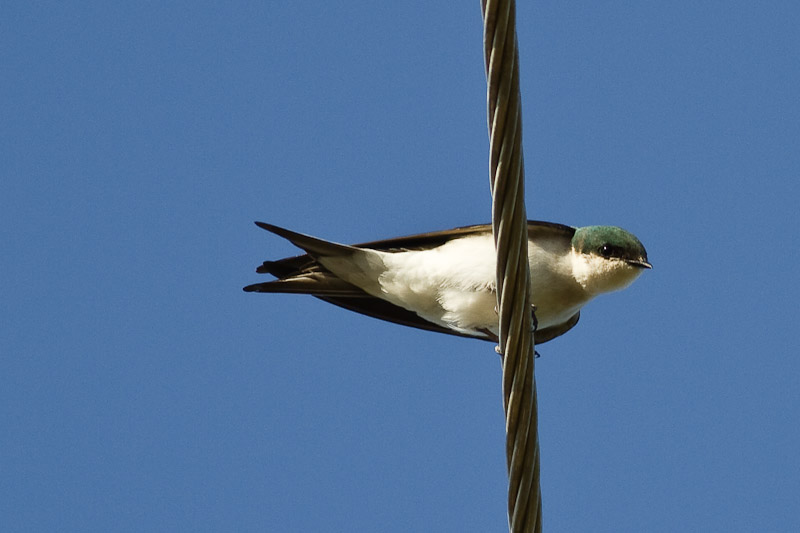
The Bahama swallow is listed as an endangered species.

Species of hirundine that are threatened with extinction are generally endangered due to habitat loss. This is presumed to be the reason behind the decline of the critically endangered white-eyed river martin, a species that is only known from a few specimens collected in Thailand. The species presumably breeds in riverbanks, a much diminished habitat in Southeast Asia. As the species has not been reliably seen since 1980, it may already be extinct. Two insular species, the Bahama swallow and golden swallow, have declined due to forest loss and also competition with introduced species such as starlings and sparrows, which compete with these swallows for nesting sites. The golden swallow formerly bred on the island of Jamaica, but was last seen there in 1989 and is now restricted to the island of Hispaniola. The blue swallow, an intra-African migrant, is threatened by habitat loss in its breeding and non-breeding sites.

== Relationship with humans ==
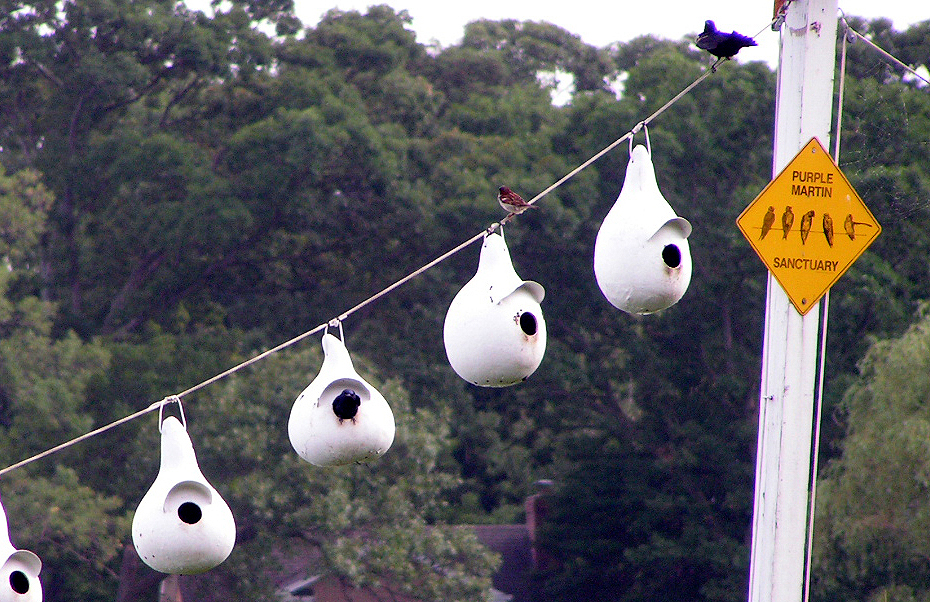
An artificial purple martin nesting colony

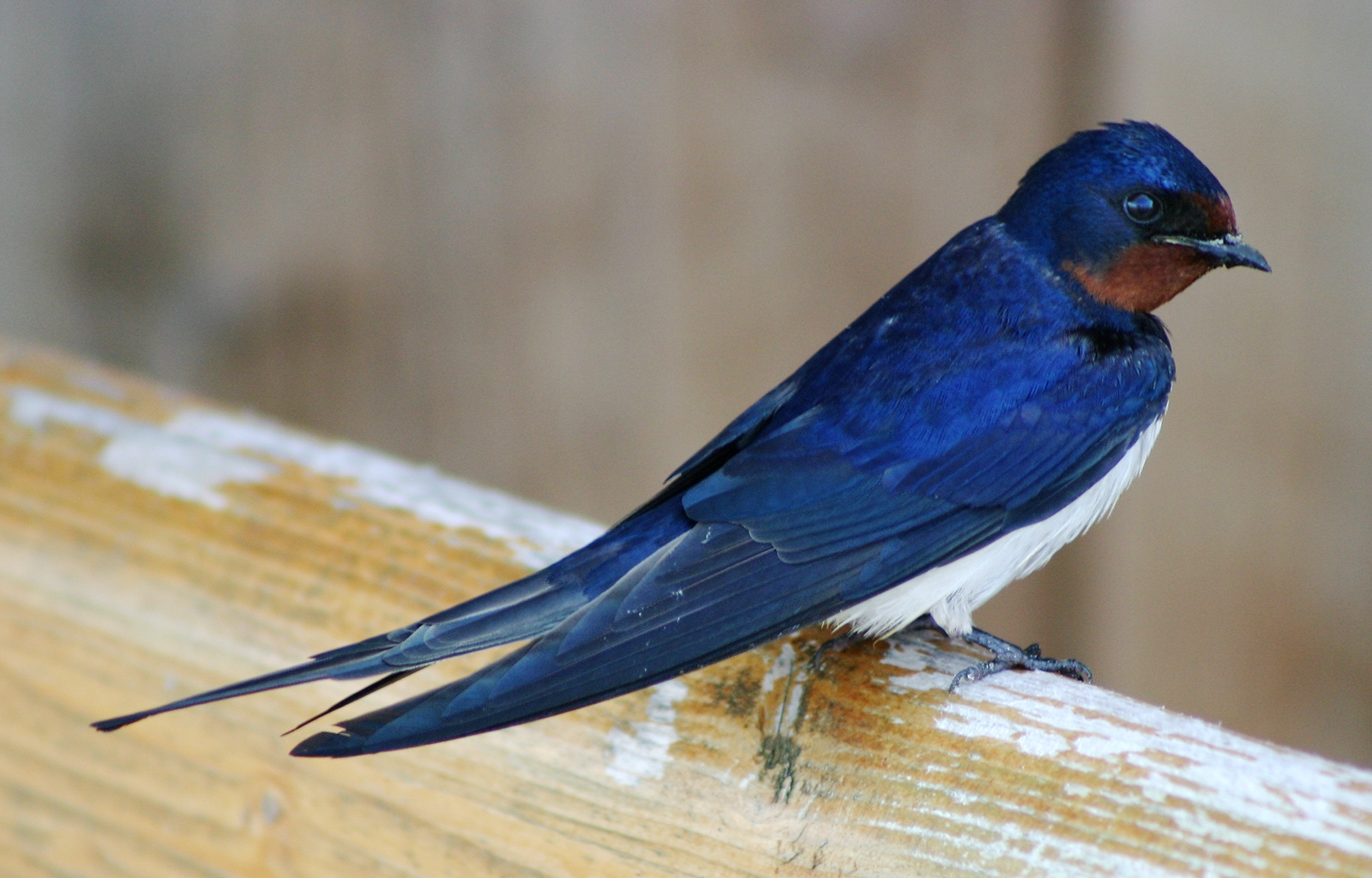
The barn swallow is the national bird of Estonia. They also are one of the most depicted birds on postage stamps around the world.

Swallows coexist well with humans because of their beneficial role as insect eaters, and some species have readily adapted to nesting in and around human habitation. The barn swallow and house martin now rarely use natural sites. The purple martin is also actively encouraged by people to nest around humans and elaborate nest boxes are erected. So many artificial nesting sites have been created that the purple martin now seldom nests in natural cavities in the eastern part of its range.

Because of the long human experience with these conspicuous species, many myths and legends have arisen as a consequence, particularly relating to the barn swallow. Roman historian Pliny the Elder described a use of painted swallows to deliver a report of the winning horses at a race. There is also the Korean folktale of Heungbu and Nolbu, which teaches a moral lesson about greed and altruism through the mending of a swallow's broken leg.

In classical mythology, the swallow is traditionally believed to have originally been a transformed woman, though her identity varies. The myth goes that Procne (or Aëdon, "nightingale") was married to king Tereus (or Polytechnus), but Tereus raped her sister Philomela (or Chelidon, "swallow"). In revenge, Procne and Philomela killed Tereus' son Itys and served him for dinner. Tereus chased down the two sisters but all three were turned into birds by the gods; Procne became a nightingale, Tereus a hoopoe and Philomela a swallow. Some Roman authors tended to swap the sisters' metamorphosis so that Procne became the swallow instead. The swallow genera Progne, Ptyonoprogne and Psalidoprocne and the treeswift family Hemiprocnidae are all named after Procne.

During the 19th century, Jean Desbouvrie attempted to tame swallows and train them for use as messenger birds, as an alternative to war pigeons. The swallows would have a light load of course, as a laden swallow could only travel about half as far as an unladen swallow in the same trip. He succeeded in curbing the migratory instinct in young birds and persuaded the government of France to conduct initial testing, but further experimentation stalled. Subsequent attempts to train homing behaviour into swallows and other passerines had difficulty establishing a statistically significant success rate, although the birds have been known to trap themselves in a cage repeatedly to get to the bait.

According to a sailing superstition, swallows are a good omen to those at sea. This probably arose from the fact that swallows are land-based birds, so their appearance informs a sailor that he or she is close to shore. An old term of venery for swallows is a "flight" or "sweep".

== Species list ==
The family contains 92 species in 21 genera.

Image	Genus	Species
	Pseudochelidon Hartlaub, 1861	African river martin, Pseudochelidon eurystomina; White-eyed river martin, Pseudochelidon sirintarae
	Psalidoprocne Cabanis, 1850	Square-tailed saw-wing, Psalidoprocne nitens; Black saw-wing, Psalidoprocne pristoptera; Fanti saw-wing, Psalidoprocne obscura; White-headed saw-wing, Psalidoprocne albiceps; Mountain saw-wing, Psalidoprocne fuliginosa
	Neophedina Roberts, 1922	Banded martin, Neophedina cincta
	Phedinopsis Wolters, 1971	Brazza's martin, Phedinopsis brazzae
	Phedina Bonaparte, 1855	Mascarene martin, Phedina borbonica
	Riparia Forster, T, 1817	Congo martin, Riparia congica; Sand martin, Riparia riparia; Pale martin, Riparia diluta; Brown-throated martin, Riparia paludicola; Grey-throated martin, Riparia chinensis; Madagascar martin, Riparia cowani
	Tachycineta Cabanis, 1850	Tree swallow, Tachycineta bicolor; Bahama swallow, Tachycineta cyaneoviridis; Violet-green swallow, Tachycineta thalassina; Golden swallow, Tachycineta euchrysea; Mangrove swallow, Tachycineta albilinea; White-rumped swallow, Tachycineta leucorrhoa; Chilean swallow, Tachycineta meyeni; Tumbes swallow, Tachycineta stolzmanni; White-winged swallow, Tachycineta albiventer
	Atticora Gould, 1842	White-banded swallow, Atticora fasciata; Black-capped swallow, Atticora pileata; White-thighed swallow, Atticora tibialis
	Pygochelidon Baird, SF, 1971	Blue-and-white swallow, Pygochelidon cyanoleuca; Black-collared swallow, Pygochelidon melanoleuca
	Alopochelidon Ridgway, 1903	Tawny-headed swallow, Alopochelidon fucata
	Orochelidon Ridgway, 1903	Pale-footed swallow, Orochelidon flavipes; Brown-bellied swallow, Orochelidon murina; Andean swallow, Orochelidon andecola
	Stelgidopteryx Baird, SF, 1858	Northern rough-winged swallow, Stelgidopteryx serripennis; Southern rough-winged swallow, Stelgidopteryx ruficollis
	Progne Boie, F, 1826	Brown-chested martin, Progne tapera; Peruvian martin, Progne murphyi; Galápagos martin, Progne modesta; Purple martin, Progne subis; Southern martin, Progne elegans; Grey-breasted martin, Progne chalybea; Sinaloa martin, Progne sinaloae; Cuban martin, Progne cryptoleuca; Caribbean martin, Progne dominicensis
	Pseudhirundo Roberts, 1922	Grey-rumped swallow, Pseudhirundo griseopyga
	Cheramoeca Cabanis, 1850	White-backed swallow, Cheramoeca leucosterna
	Ptyonoprogne Reichenbach, 1850	Eurasian crag martin, Ptyonoprogne rupestris; Pale crag martin, Ptyonoprogne obsoleta; Red-throated rock martin, Ptyonoprogne rufigula; Large rock martin, Ptyonoprogne fuligula; Dusky crag martin, Ptyonoprogne concolor
	Hirundo Linnaeus, 1758	Black-and-rufous swallow, Hirundo nigrorufa; Blue swallow, Hirundo atrocaerulea; Pied-winged swallow, Hirundo leucosoma; White-tailed swallow, Hirundo megaensis; Pearl-breasted swallow, Hirundo dimidiata; Pacific swallow, Hirundo tahitica; Hill swallow, Hirundo domicola; Welcome swallow, Hirundo neoxena; White-throated swallow, Hirundo albigularis; Wire-tailed swallow, Hirundo smithii; White-bibbed swallow, Hirundo nigrita; Barn swallow, Hirundo rustica; Angola swallow, Hirundo angolensis; Red-chested swallow, Hirundo lucida; Ethiopian swallow, Hirundo aethiopica
	Delichon Moore, F, 1854	Western house martin, Delichon urbicum; Siberian house martin, Delichon lagopodum; Asian house martin, Delichon dasypus; Nepal house martin, Delichon nipalense
	Cecropis Boie, F, 1826	Greater striped swallow, Cecropis cucullata; European red-rumped swallow, Cecropis rufula; Eastern red-rumped swallow, Cecropis daurica; African red-rumped swallow, Cecropis melanocrissus; Sri Lanka swallow, Cecropis hyperythra; Rufous-bellied swallow, Cecropis badia; Lesser striped swallow, Cecropis abyssinica; Red-breasted swallow, Cecropis semirufa; Mosque swallow, Cecropis senegalensis
	Atronanus De Silva, 2018	Forest swallow, Atronanus fuliginosus
	Petrochelidon Cabanis, 1850	American cliff swallow, Petrochelidon pyrrhonota; Cave swallow, Petrochelidon fulva; Chestnut-collared swallow, Petrochelidon rufocollaris; Preuss's cliff swallow, Petrochelidon preussi; Red-throated cliff swallow, Petrochelidon rufigula; Red Sea cliff swallow, Petrochelidon perdita; South African cliff swallow, Petrochelidon spilodera; Streak-throated swallow, Petrochelidon fluvicola; Fairy martin, Petrochelidon ariel; Tree martin, Petrochelidon nigricans
