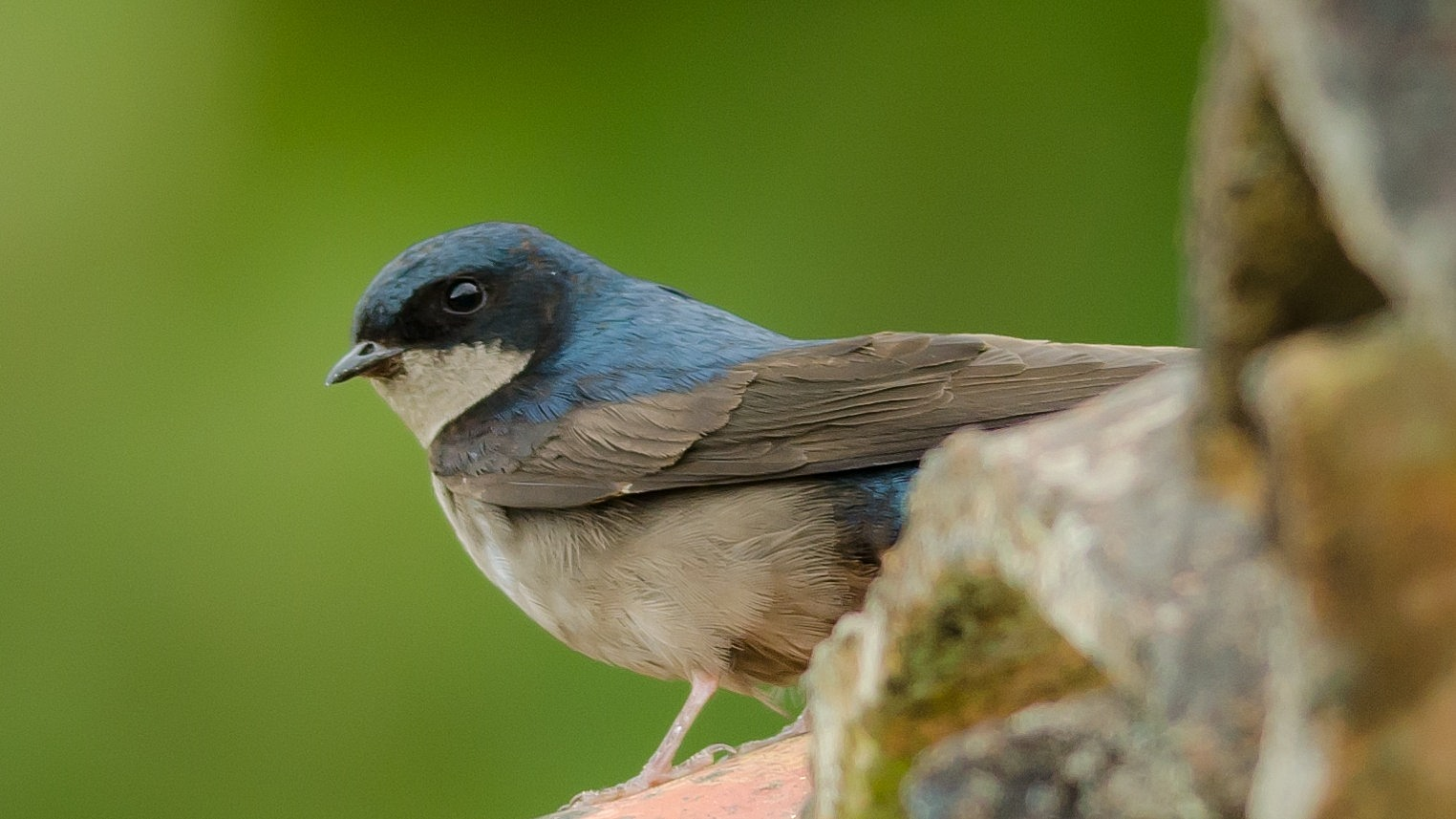

Conservation status
- Least Concern (IUCN 3.1)

Scientific classification
- Kingdom: Animalia
- Phylum: Chordata
- Class: Aves
- Order: Passeriformes
- Family: Hirundinidae
- Genus: Orochelidon
- Species: O. murina

Binomial name
- Orochelidon murina (Cassin, 1853)

= Brown-bellied swallow =

Species of bird

The brown-bellied swallow (Orochelidon murina) is a species of bird in the family Hirundinidae, the swallows and martins. It is found in Bolivia, Colombia, Ecuador, Peru, and Venezuela.

== Taxonomy and systematics ==
The brown-bellied swallow was originally described as Petrochilidon murina. Since then it had been placed in both Notiochelidon and Atticora. Following a study published in 2005 it was moved to the resurrected genus Orochelidon that had been erected in 1903.

The brown-bellied swallow shares genus Oroichelidon with the pale-footed swallow (O. flavipes) and Andean swallow (O. andecola). It has three subspecies, the nominate O. m. murina (Cassin, 1853), O. m. meridensis (Zimmer, JT & Phelps, WH, 1947), and O. m. cyanodorsalis (Carriker, 1935).

== Description ==
The brown-bellied swallow is about 14 cm (5.5 in) long and weighs about 12.5 g (0.44 oz). The sexes have similar plumage though females are duller overall than males. Adult males of the nominate subspecies have a mostly blackish head and neck with a blue-green gloss and a sooty gray-brown throat. Their upperparts are blackish with a blue-green gloss. Their tail is moderately forked; it and their wings are dark brown. Their underparts are mostly sooty gray-brown with black undertail coverts. Juveniles are duller than adults with a brown throat, gray-white underparts, and a shorter tail. Subspecies O. m. meridensis has bluer upperparts than the nominate. The male's undertail coverts have dark metallic blue tips and females' have brown tips. O. m. cyanodorsalis has a steel-blue gloss on its upperparts and black undertail coverts.

== Distribution and habitat ==
The brown-bellied swallow has a disjunct distribution. Subspecies O. m. meridensis is the northernmost. It is found in the isolated Sierra Nevada de Santa Marta in northern Colombia, in the Serranía del Perijá that straddles the Colombia-Venezuela border, and from Trujillo in western Venezuela south through Colombia's Eastern Andes as far as Boyacá Department. The nominate subspecies is found in from Antioquia Department in northwestern Colombia south through Ecuador to south-central Peru. O. m. cyanodorsalis is found from Puno Department in southeastern Peru south to central Bolivia.

The brown-bellied swallow is a bird of the Andes. It inhabits open to semi-open landscapes such as grasslands, shrublands, elfin forest, Polylepis woodlands, farmland, and areas around houses, and is often found near water. In elevation it has been documented in Venezuela between 2,200 and 3,000 m (7,200 and 9,800 ft) with sight records both lower and higher. It is found between 2,000 and 3,600 m (6,600 and 11,800 ft) in Colombia, mostly between 2,500 and 4,000 m (8,200 and 13,100 ft) in Ecuador, and between 2,200 and 4,300 m (7,200 and 14,100 ft) in Peru.

== Behavior ==
=== Movement ===
The brown-bellied swallow is primarily a year-round resident but some seasonal and local movements have been noted (though not fully documented) in Venezuela.

=== Feeding ===
The brown-bellied swallow feeds on insects captured in mid-air, though its diet is not known in detail. It forages singly, in pairs, and in flocks of up to about 30 individuals that may include other swallow species. It usually forages low over the ground with a fast, direct, flight, though also while circling high in the air.

=== Breeding ===
The brown-bellied swallow's breeding season has not been fully defined but includes at least September and October in Colombia and Ecuador. It nests solitarily and also in small colonies. It builds a nest of grass and moss with a feather lining in a cavity such as in a cliff, road cutting, or human habitation. The clutch is two to three eggs. The incubation period, time to fledging, and details of parental care are not known.

=== Vocalization ===
The brown-bellied swallow's song is "a weak buzzing" and its contact call a "tjrip tjirp-tjrip-tjirp". One description of its flight call is "a rather scratchy tjrrrp". Its call is also described as a "deep, buzzy tchjet" that sometimes is extended to "tchjet-djshhhhEW".

== Status ==
The IUCN has assessed the brown-bellied swallow as being of Least Concern. It has a very large range; its population size is not known but is believed to be stable. No immediate threats have been identified. It is considered "numerous" in the Venezuelan Andes during the west season and less so in the dry. It is considered common in Colombia and Ecuador and fairly common in Peru. It occurs in several protected areas within its range.

== Gallery ==
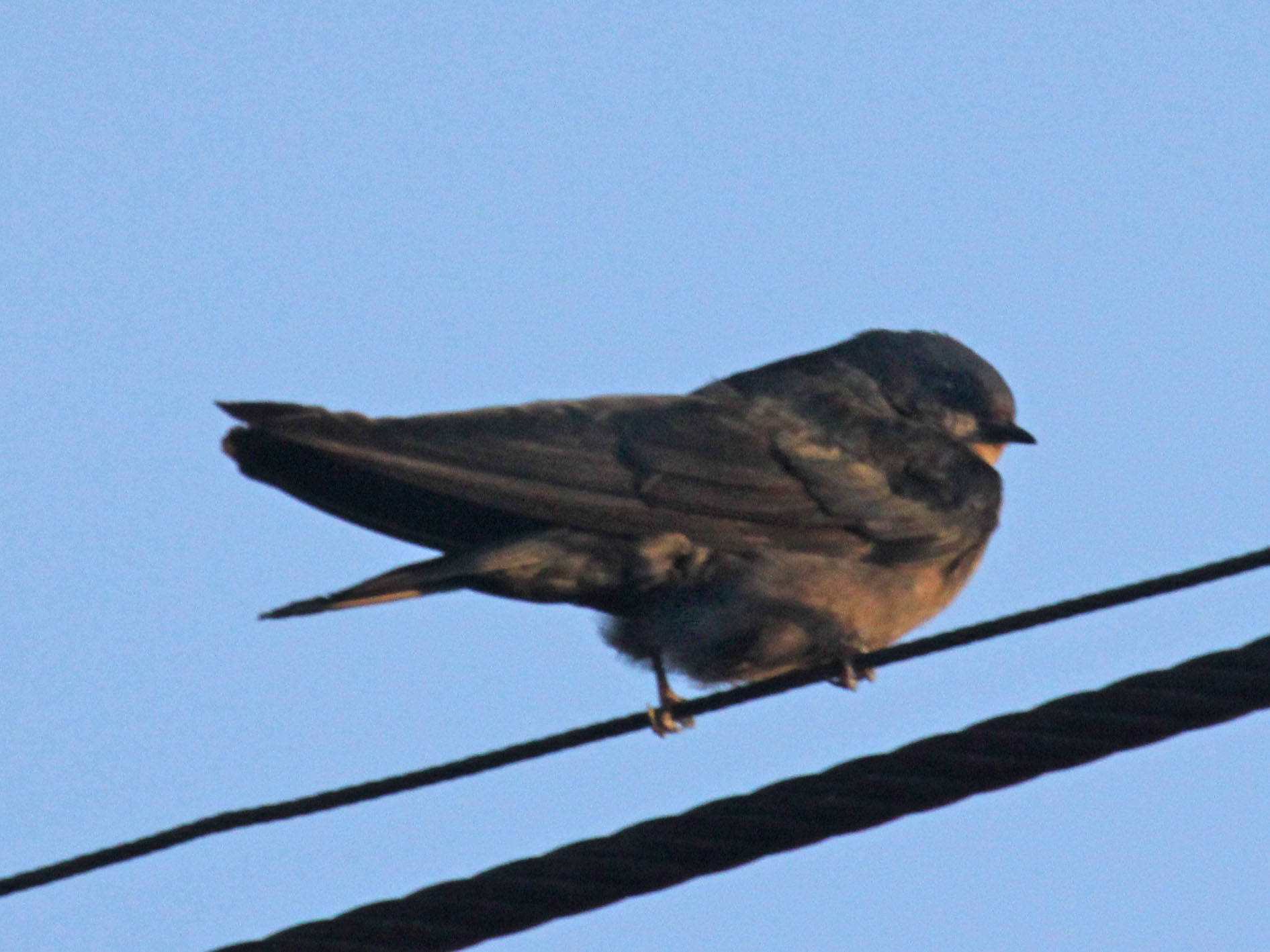
Brown-bellied swallow

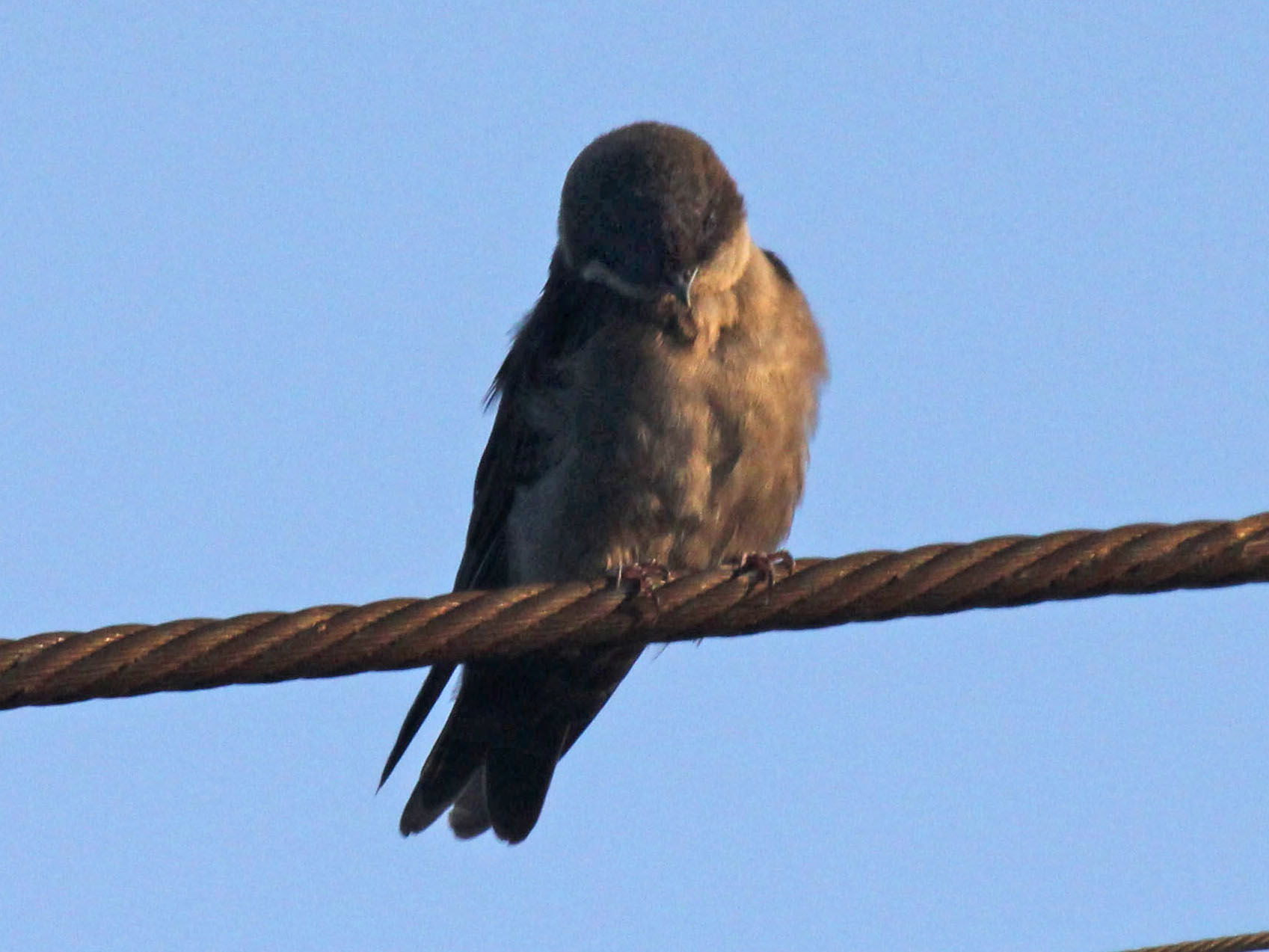
Brown-bellied swallow

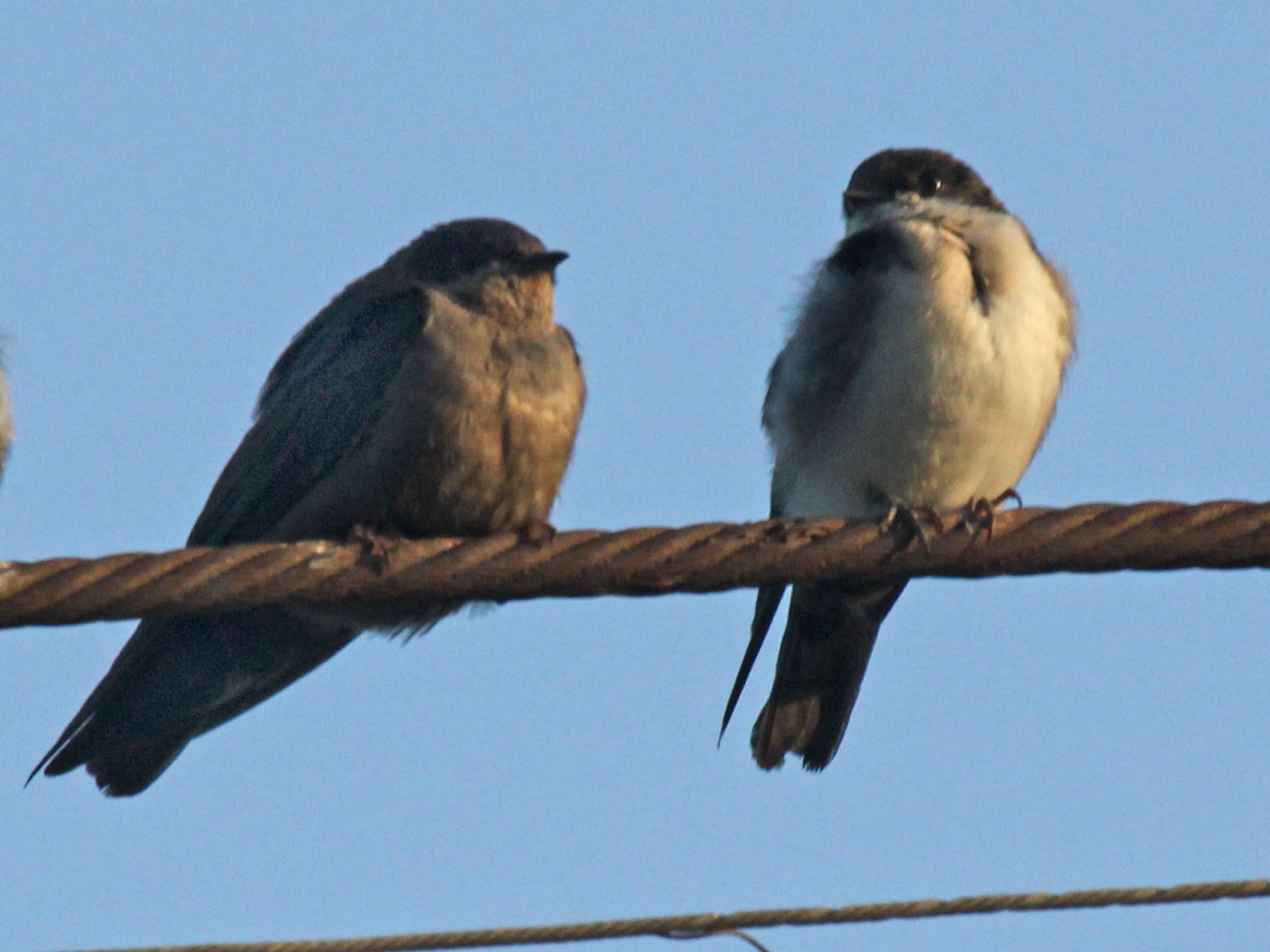
Brown-bellied swallow and blue-and-white swallow
