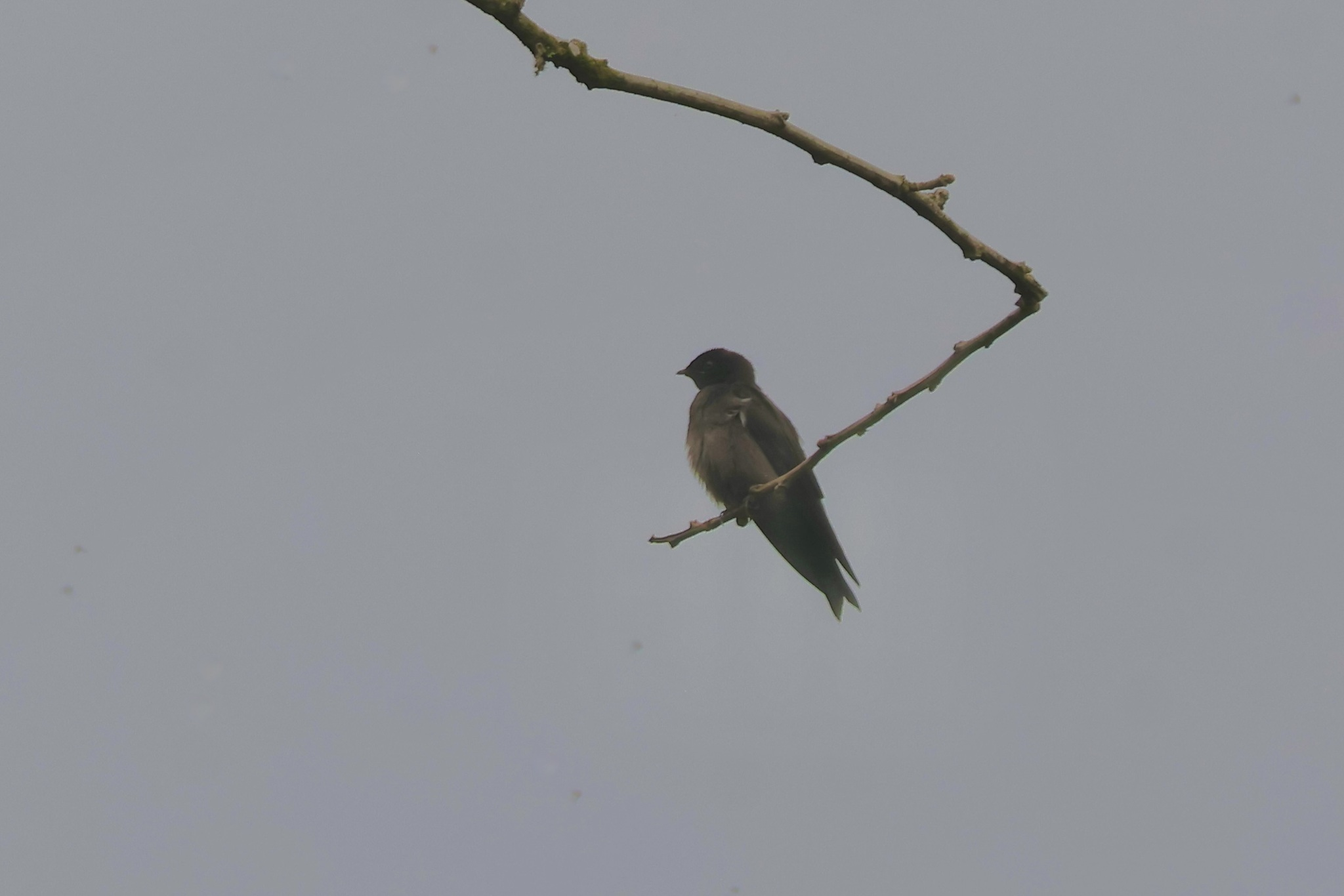

Conservation status
- Least Concern (IUCN 3.1)

Scientific classification
- Kingdom: Animalia
- Phylum: Chordata
- Class: Aves
- Order: Passeriformes
- Family: Hirundinidae
- Genus: Atronanus de Silva TN, Fernando, Robbins, Cooper, JC, Fokam & Peterson, 2018
- Species: A. fuliginosus

Binomial name
- Atronanus fuliginosus (Chapin, 1925)

Synonyms
- Petrochelidon fuliginosa

= Forest swallow =

Species of bird

The forest swallow (Atronanus fuliginosus) is a little-known species of swallow in the family Hirundinidae, found in Cameroon, Republic of the Congo, Equatorial Guinea, Gabon, and Nigeria.

The species was previously placed in the genus Petrochelidon, within the 'mud-nester' clade of swallows, yet its plumage, morphology, and nesting behavior did not align well with those of other major swallow lineages. As a consequence, and also employing molecular phylogenetic approaches, De Silva et al. (2018) placed this species in the swallow phylogenetic tree, firmly within the 'mud nester' clade, but outside of the clade corresponding to Petrochelidon. This outcome led De Silva et al. (2018) to document and describe formally a distinct, generic-level lineage of swallow endemic to the Lower Guinean forest region of central Africa.

De Silva et al. (2018) proposed to recognize the distinctiveness of this taxon at the generic level. This species was originally described in the genus Lecythoplastes (Chapin, 1925) with Preuss's cliff swallow Petrochelidon preussi. Lecythoplastes had been proposed originally based on preussi as a type species by Reichenow (1898), and preussi falls firmly within Petrochelidon in all of their phylogenetic analyses. As such, Lecythoplastes must remain submerged in Petrochelidon; therefore De Silva et al. erected a new genus, Atronanus, comprising the monotypic forest swallow.
