= Brazza's martin =

Conservation status
- Least Concern (IUCN 3.1)

Scientific classification
- Kingdom: Animalia
- Phylum: Chordata
- Class: Aves
- Order: Passeriformes
- Family: Hirundinidae
- Genus: Phedinopsis; Wolters, 1971
- Species: P. brazzae

Binomial name
- Phedinopsis brazzae (Oustalet, 1886)
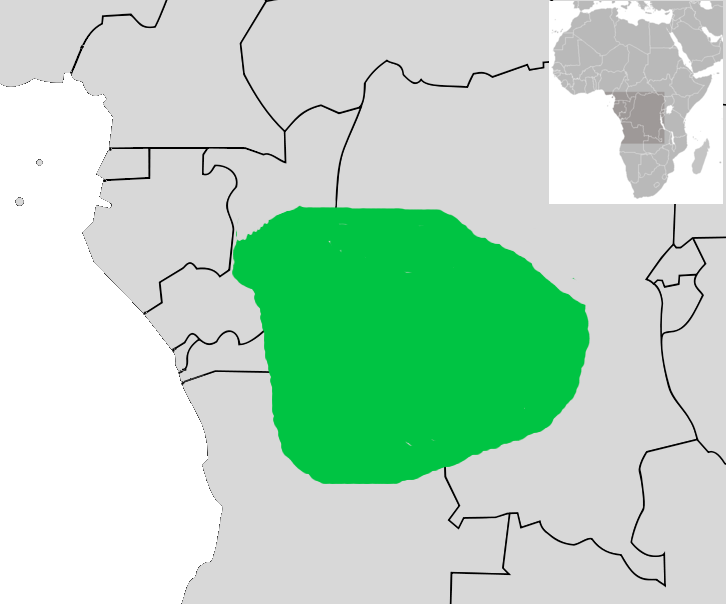
- Approximate range in Africa

Species of bird found in Africa

Brazza's martin (Phedinopsis brazzae) is a passerine bird in the swallow family, Hirundinidae. It is 12 centimeters (4.7 in) long with grey-brown upperparts, heavily black-streaked white underparts, and a brownish tint to the breast plumage. The sexes are similar, but juvenile birds have more diffuse breast streaking and reddish-brown edges to the feathers of the back and wings. The song consists of a series of short notes of increasing frequency, followed by a complex buzz that is sometimes completed by a number of clicks.

The range of this species falls within the African countries of Angola, the Republic of the Congo, and the Democratic Republic of the Congo. Nesting in burrows in river banks, it lays a clutch of three white eggs. This bird feeds on flying insects, including termites, and may hunt over rivers or open savanna. It forms mixed flocks with other swallows, but is readily identified by its combination of brown upperparts, streaked underparts, and square tail.

Although this little-known bird had been classified as data deficient by the International Union for Conservation of Nature (IUCN), it actually appears to be common and widespread, and it has been listed as a species of Least Concern since 2008. There may be some hunting of this martin for food, but the species does not appear to be facing any serious short-term threats.

== Taxonomy ==
The Brazza's martin was first described in 1886 under the binomial name Phedina brazzae by the French zoologist Émile Oustalet from a specimen obtained at Nganchu in the Ngabé District of what is now the Republic of Congo. This martin is now the only species placed in the genus Phedinopsis that was introduced in 1971 by the German ornithologist Hans Edmund Wolters. The genus name, Phedinopsis, combines the genus Phedina with the Ancient Greek opsis meaning "appearance". The species name commemorates Italian-born French explorer Pierre Savorgnan de Brazza, later to become governor-general of the French Congo, who collected the type specimen. This species was often called the "Congo martin", but this invites confusion with the Congo sand martin or Congo martin, Riparia congica.

Brazza's martin is a member of the swallow family of birds, and is classed as a member of the Hirundininae subfamily, which comprises all swallows and martins except the very distinctive river martins. DNA sequence studies suggest that there are three major groupings within the Hirundininae, broadly correlating with the type of nest built. These groups are the "core martins", including burrowing species like the sand martin; the "nest-adopters", which are birds like the tree swallow that use natural cavities; and the "mud nest builders", such as the barn swallow, which build a nest from mud. The species nests in burrows and therefore belong to the "core martins" group.

Brazza's martin is thought to be an early offshoot from the main swallow lineage, although the striped plumage suggests a distant relationship with several streaked African Hirundo species. Brazza's martin was previously included in the genus Phedina, although it is now included in its own genus Phedinopsis due to the significant differences in vocalisations and nest type from its relative.

== Description ==
The Brazza's martin is 12 cm (4.7 in) long with wings averaging 100.5 mm (3.96 in). This small hirundine has grey-brown upperparts with a somewhat darker brown head and white underparts heavily streaked with blackish-brown from the throat to vent. There is a brownish tint to the breast plumage. The square tail averages 46.8 mm (1.84 in) long and has white edges to the brown undertail coverts. The flight feathers are blackish-brown and the bill and legs are black. The eyes are dark brown and the black bill averages 8.5 mm (0.33 in) long. The sexes are similar, but juvenile birds have more diffuse breast streaking and reddish-brown or buff edges to the feathers of the back and wings. This bird has no subspecies.

The song consists of a series of short notes increasing in frequency which are followed by a complex buzz and sometimes completed by a number of clicks. The song becomes increasingly loud, although the final clicks are quite soft. The song is similar to that of the banded martin, and does not resemble the Mascarene martin, suggesting unresolved taxonomic problems. The flight is variously described as heavy, or like that of a sand martin.

Brazza's martin can be distinguished from most other swallows within its range by the heavy streaking on the underparts. Although the lesser striped swallow also has white underparts with dark streaking, it is larger, has a deeply forked tail and a very different plumage, with dark blue upperparts, a red rump and a chestnut head. Compared to the Mascarene martin, this species is smaller, has a plainer back and finer dashing on the throat and chest, but there is no range overlap.

== Distribution and habitat ==
The distribution of the Brazza's martin was initially poorly known, and until 1922 the type specimen in the Paris Museum was the only recorded example of this species. A Father Callewaert then collected 20 martins near Luluabourg (now Kananga), and this bird is now known to breed in the south of the Democratic Republic of the Congo (DRC), the Republic of the Congo, and in northern Angola. There is one probable sighting from southeast Gabon.

In the breeding season this martin is found near rivers with the steep banks that are needed for the nest burrows. Suitable habitat occurs along lowland tropical rivers like the Congo or rivers with sandbanks in the highlands of Angola. The highland locations have wide grassy riverways running through miombo woodlands, whereas the Congo Basin is tropical forest with over 200 cm (80 in) of rain a year. The lowland habitats are a patchwork of dry, seasonally flooded and permanently wet woodland, and seasonally flooded savanna, and the swamp forests contain trees such as Symphonia globulifera, raffia palms and Mitragyna species, and the riverbanks are often lined with arrowroot. This martin seems to be able to adapt to open savanna habitats containing Hymenocardia acida, in which it will roost overnight when not breeding, and is therefore not heavily dependent on the neighbouring forests as long as the riverine breeding sites survive.

== Behaviour ==
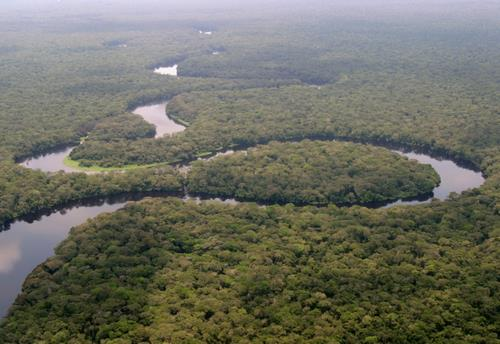
Breeding habitat in the Democratic Republic of the Congo

In a presumed example of courtship behaviour, a male Brazza's martin perched about 30 cm (1 ft) away from a female and sang for about ten minutes. As it sang, the male leant towards the female, which caused the still-folded wings and tail to rise relative to the body. The Brazza's martin nests in the vertical banks of forested rivers from July to October, at the end of the dry season but before the river levels are high enough to cause flooding. A small colony of four pairs was recorded breeding near a rocky outcrop on the side of a valley.

The Brazza's martin nests singly or in loose colonies with sometimes widely separated burrows. The nest is a small heap of soft material such as feathers or dry grass at the end of a typically 50 cm (20 in) tunnel. The normal clutch is three white eggs. The eggs measure 18.5 mm × 11.25 mm (0.728 in × 0.443 in) and weigh 1.5 g (0.05 oz). The incubation and fledging times are unknown, although as with all hirundines the chicks are altricial, hatching naked and blind.

As with other swallows, Brazza's martin feeds on flying insects, including termites, and may hunt over rivers or open savanna. It can occur in single-species flocks or with other swallows including barn swallows, lesser striped swallows, or rock martins.

== Status ==
There has been little ornithological research in this part of Africa, and until 2008 the Brazza's martin was classified as data deficient. It was thought to have a much more restricted distribution range, but a 2007 paper presented evidence that extended its known range by 500 km (300 mi) to the north and 175 km (100 mi) southwards, a quadrupling of the area. It has a large range of 402,000 km^{2} (155,000 sq mi) although the total population is unknown. Its extensive range and apparently stable population means this bird is classed as Least Concern on the IUCN Red List.

It is likely that this species is dug out for food by humans, but its small, dispersed colonies in firm soil suggest that it is a less rewarding target than the densely packed sandbank nests of species such as the African river martin and rosy bee-eater. Breeding colonies in river sandbars are liable to flooding, but neither natural causes nor hunting appears to be having a serious impact, and this species seems under no immediate threat. Its ability to use degraded habitats also aids its survival. The Brazza's martin is not a protected species in Angola, the DRC, or the Republic of Congo.

== Cited texts and general references ==
- Crochet, P-A; Barthel, P H; Bauer, H-G; van den Berg, A B; Bezzel, E; Collinson, J M; Dietzen, C; Dubois, P J; Fromholtz, J; Helbig, A J; Jiguet, F; Jirle, E; Knox, A G; Krüger, T; Le Maréchal, P; van Loon, A J; Päckert, M; Parkin, D T; Pons, J-M; Raty, L; Roselaar, C S; Sangster, G; Steinheimer, F D; Svensson, L; Tyrberg, T; Votier, S C; Yésou, P (2011). AERC TAC's Taxonomic Recommendations: 2011 Report (PDF). Luxembourg: AERC.
- de Klemm, Cyrille; Lausche, Barbara J (1986). African Wildlife Laws (PDF). IUCN Environmental Policy & Law Occasional Paper No. 3. Gland: World Conservation Union. ISBN 2-88032-091-7.
- Jobling, James A. (2010). The Helm Dictionary of Scientific Bird Names (PDF). London: Christopher Helm. ISBN 978-1-4081-2501-4.
- Reichenow, Anton (1903). Die Vögel Afrikas: Zweiter Band [The Birds of Africa Volume 2] (in German). Neudam: J Neuman. OCLC 987987289.
- Sharpe, Richard Bowdler; Wyatt, Claude Wilmott (1894). A Monograph of the Hirundinidae: Volume 1. London: Self-published. OCLC 7428075.
- Turner, Angela K; Rose, Chris (1989). A Handbook to the Swallows and Martins of the World. London: Christopher Helm. ISBN 0-7470-3202-5.
