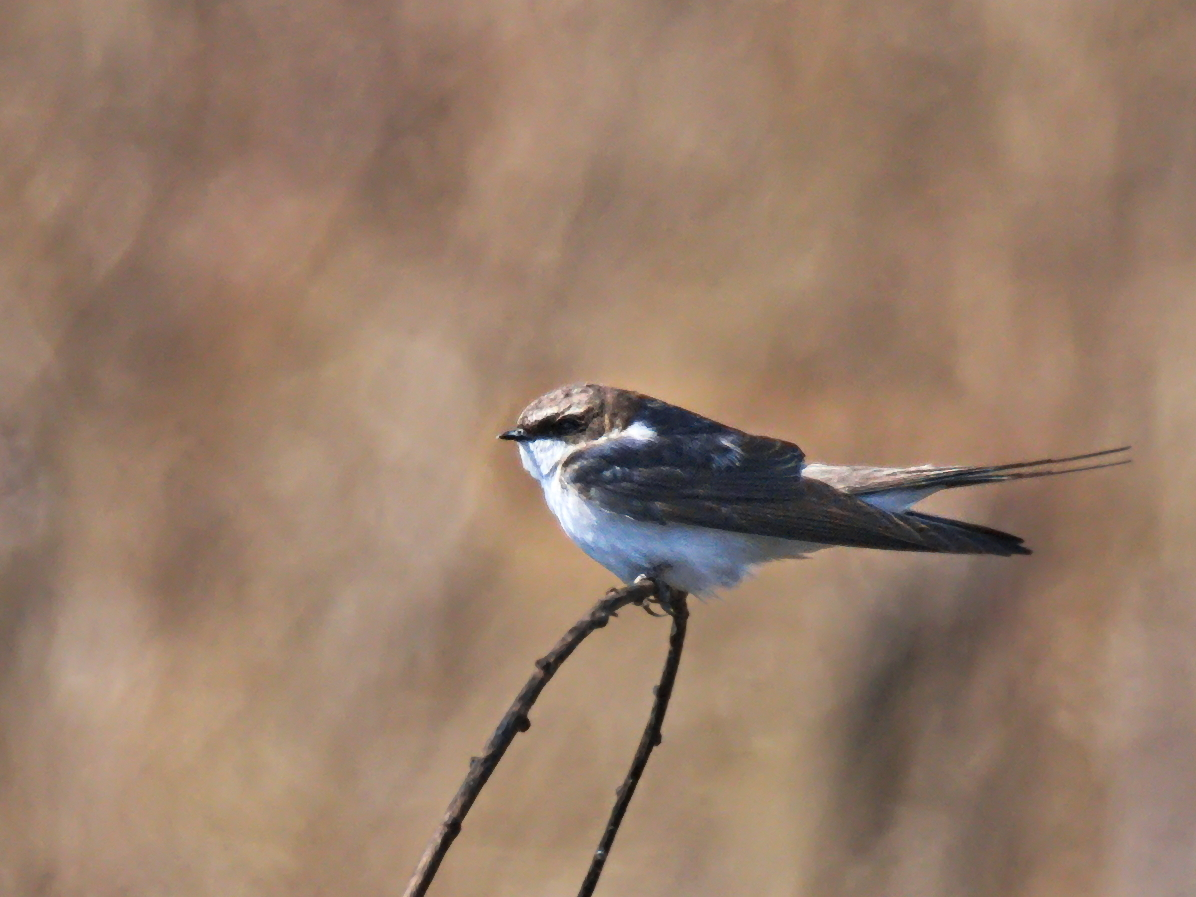
- Grey-rumped Swallow

Conservation status
- Least Concern (IUCN 3.1)

Scientific classification
- Kingdom: Animalia
- Phylum: Chordata
- Class: Aves
- Order: Passeriformes
- Family: Hirundinidae
- Genus: Pseudhirundo; Roberts, 1922
- Species: P. griseopyga

Binomial name
- Pseudhirundo griseopyga (Sundevall, 1850)

Synonyms
- Hirundo griseopyga griseopyga Sibley and Monroe (1990, 1993)

= Grey-rumped swallow =

Species of bird

The grey-rumped swallow (Pseudhirundo griseopyga) is a species of swallow. It is the only member of the genus Pseudhirundo.

It is found in Angola, Benin, Botswana, Burkina Faso, Burundi, Cameroon, Central African Republic, Republic of the Congo, Democratic Republic of the Congo, Ivory Coast, Equatorial Guinea, Eswatini, Ethiopia, Gabon, Gambia, Ghana, Guinea, Guinea-Bissau, Kenya, Liberia, Malawi, Mali, Mozambique, Namibia, Niger, Nigeria, Rwanda, Senegal, Sierra Leone, South Africa, Sudan, Tanzania, Uganda, Zambia, and Zimbabwe.

Phylogenetic analysis has shown that the grey-rumped swallow is most closely related to the white-backed swallow (Cheramoeca leucosterna) that is found in Australia.
