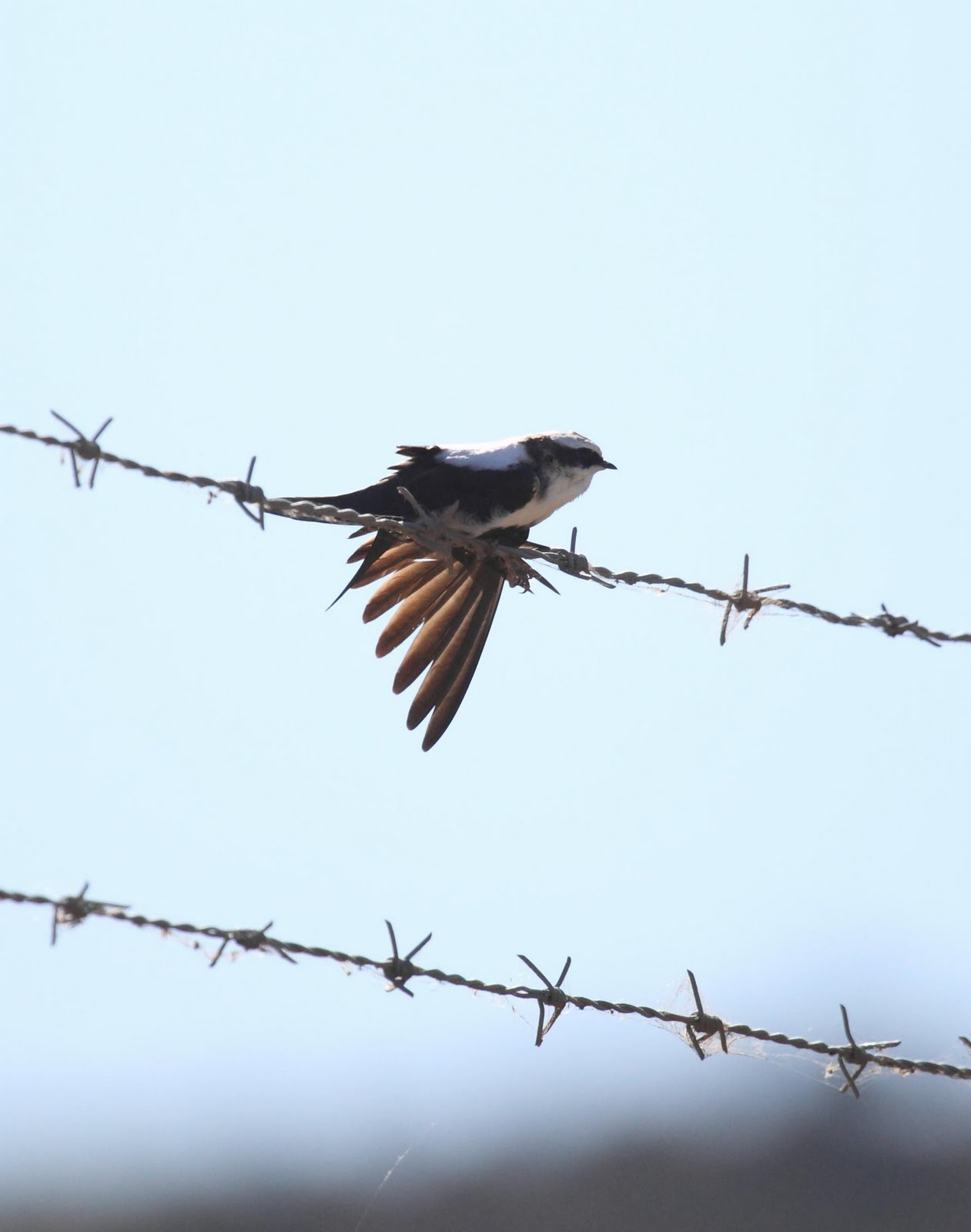

Conservation status
- Least Concern (IUCN 3.1)

Scientific classification
- Kingdom: Animalia
- Phylum: Chordata
- Class: Aves
- Order: Passeriformes
- Family: Hirundinidae
- Genus: Cheramoeca; Cabanis, 1851
- Species: C. leucosterna

Binomial name
- Cheramoeca leucosterna (Gould, 1841)
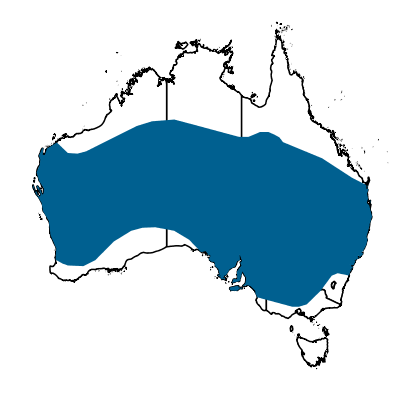

= White-backed swallow =

Species of bird

The white-backed swallow (Cheramoeca leucosterna) is a member of the swallow family Hirundinidae and is endemic to Australia. It is the only species placed in the genus Cheramoeca. As with all swallows, it is characterised by adaptation to aerial feeding. It can be identified by its white back, surrounded by black wings and tail. It has a wide distribution, from the southern part of the Australian continent, up to the Tropic of Capricorn. The white-backed swallow prefers grasslands and will create a burrow nest.

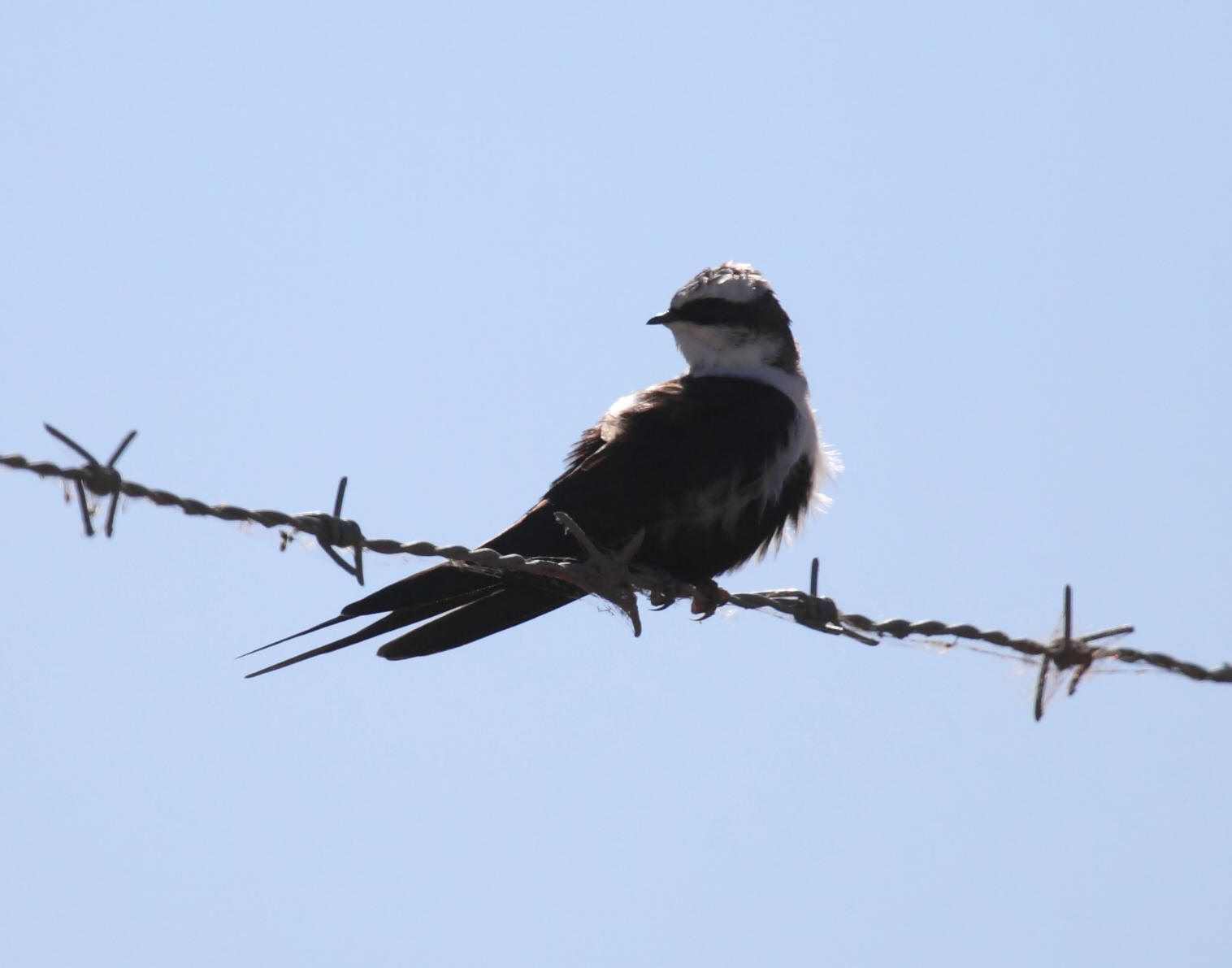
Sitting white-backed swallow

== Taxonomy ==
The white-backed swallow was formally described in 1841 by the English ornithologist John Gould based on a specimen collected on the banks of the Namoi River in New South Wales, Australia. Gould coined the binomial name Hirundo leucosternus. The white-backed swallow is now the only species placed in the genus Cheramoeca that was introduced in 1851 by the German ornithologist Jean Cabanis. The genus name combines the Ancient Greek khēramos meaning "hole", "cleft" or "hollow" with oikeō meaning "to inhabit". The specific epithet is from the Ancient Greek leukosternos meaning "white-chested" (from leukos "white" and sternon meaning "breast"). Gould's spelling of the epithet is now considered to be incorrect. As a Latinised adjective the epithet should agree with a feminine genus name which means that the original binomial name should be written as Hirundo leucosterna. The white-backed swallow is sometimes referred to as the "black-and-white swallow" or the "white-breasted swallow". Phylogenetic analysis has shown that the white-backed swallow is most closely related to the grey-rumped swallow (Pseudhirundo griseopyga) that is widely distributed across Africa.

== Description ==
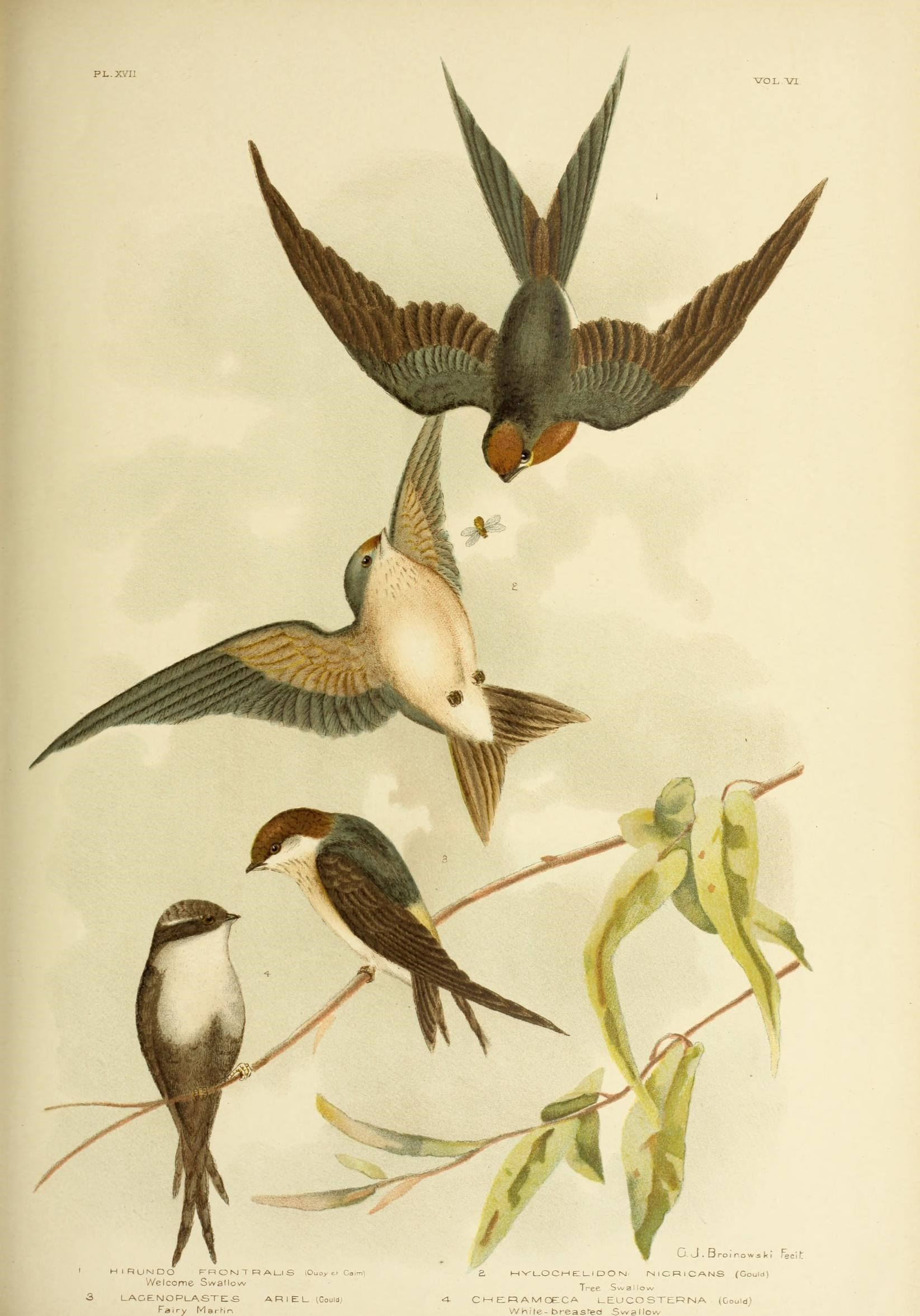
Cheramoeca leucosterna

An adult white-backed swallow averages 15 cm long, similar in size to other swallows found in Australia. The adult has a mottled grey cap above white eyebrows and a grey eye. It has a dark stripe running from the lores and across the nape of the neck. The back and most of the breast is white. The belly, wings and tail are black.

The white-backed swallow has a deeply forked tail, with curved and pointed wings. The short bill is black; the legs and feet are grey. It has a slender, streamlined body. The eyes consist of a prominent, dark iris. The sexes have similar colouring but during adolescence the white-backed swallow has duller colours.

== Distribution and habitat ==
White-backed swallows are endemic to Australia and have a wide population distribution on the continent. They can be found from the southern latitudes of Australia and their range extends to the Tropic of Capricorn. Occasionally, after inland rainfall, white-backed swallows can extend their range to encompass the entire southern portion of Australia including the desert regions. White-backed swallows prefer open country, above open grassland and low shrubs. During the breeding season, they have a strong preference for habitats around creek beds.

There is no population count, but the species is reported to be common. Due to range expansion from land clearance and mining, the population is estimated to be increasing. Due to the large range and increasing population, the white-backed swallow is categorised as least concern by the IUCN.

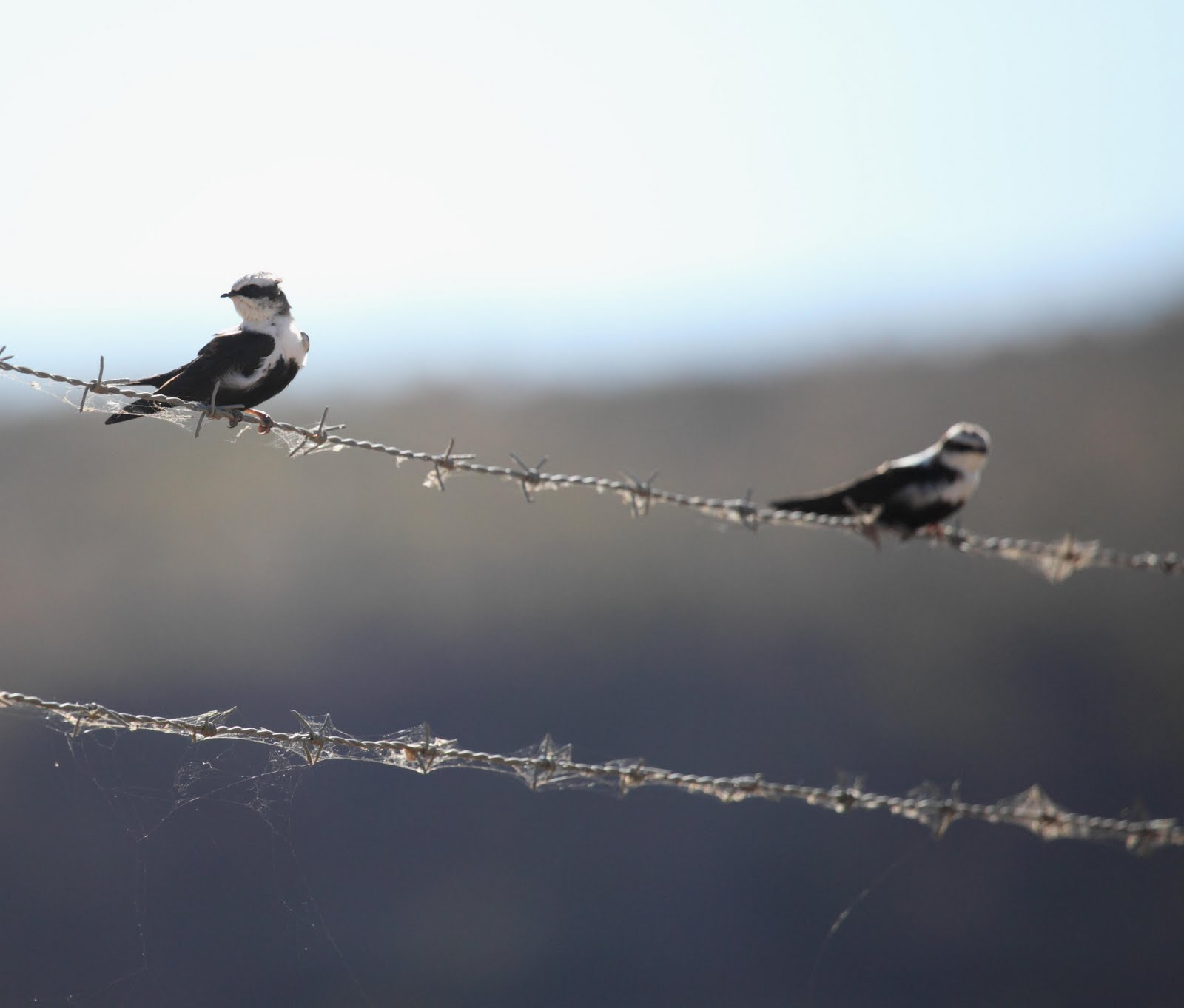
Pair of swallows on barbed wire fence

== Behaviour ==
White-backed swallows are insectivorous and feed in-flight on insects, like all known swallows. The composition of their diet varies by geographic region and with the time of year. They typically nest by digging a horizontal tunnel into a vertical dirt cliff. Predation of swallows nests is known to occur, typically from foxes and cats.
