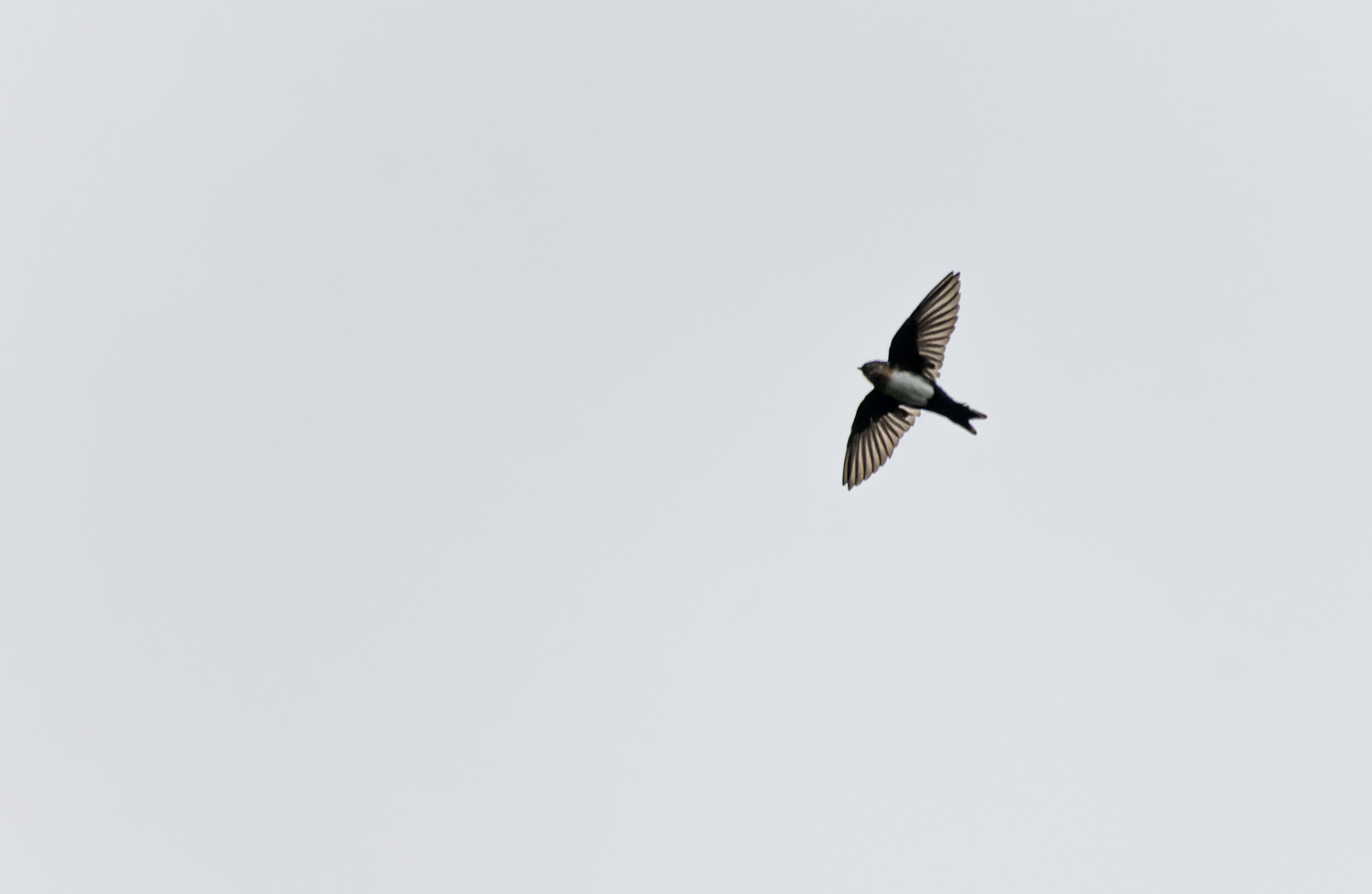

Conservation status
- Least Concern (IUCN 3.1)

Scientific classification
- Kingdom: Animalia
- Phylum: Chordata
- Class: Aves
- Order: Passeriformes
- Family: Hirundinidae
- Genus: Orochelidon
- Species: O. flavipes

Binomial name
- Orochelidon flavipes (Chapman, 1922); Junín, Peru
- Distribution map

= Pale-footed swallow =

Species of bird

The pale-footed swallow (Orochelidon flavipes) is a species of bird in the family Hirundinidae. It is found in the northern Andes, from Venezuela to Bolivia. It is monotypic.

Its natural habitat is subtropical or tropical moist montane forests. They are usually seen in small flocks, occasionally with the blue-and-white swallow.

They are classified as a least-concern species by the International Union for Conservation of Nature (IUCN).

== Taxonomy and etymology ==
This swallow is monotypic.

The pale-footed swallow is also known as the cloud-forest swallow, supposedly because it is known to reside in cloud forests.

== Description ==
This swallow has an average length of 12 cm (4.7 in) and an average weight of 10.6 g (0.37 oz). It has dark, glossy blue upperparts, with the wing, tail, and undertail coverts being more black than the rest. They have a dusky chin and a throat coloured cinnamon-buff. The white chest is tinged cinnamon-buff. The belly is also white. They have blackish-brown underwing coverts, axillars, flanks, and tibial feathers. They have a black bill with pink mouth-lining and a dark brown iris. They have a slightly notched tail. Their lower legs and toes are made of pink flesh. The sexes are similar, and the immature swallows of this species are similar, except their undertail coverts have white or pale edges.

These birds are not to be confused with the very similar blue-and-white swallow, which can be differentiated by the pale-footed swallow's blackish flanks, and its faster flight. The pale-footed swallow is also slightly smaller than the blue-and-white swallow.

The pale-footed swallow has a flight call frequently described as a dzreet. Their call can be differentiated from the call of the similar blue-and-white swallow by the fact that it is drier than that of the blue-and-white swallow. These swallows also have been known to use a call described as a trilled tre-e-e-ed. The song is a series of trills and thin warbles, which is described as buzzy, but musical.

== Distribution ==
This swallow is native to the Andes in Bolivia, Colombia, Ecuador, Peru, and Venezuela. It usually occurs only on the eastern slopes of the Andes, but it has been recorded on both slopes in the central Andes. They usually don't go below 2,600 m (8,500 ft) or above 3,300 m (10,800 ft) in Ecuador, and not below 2,000 m (6,600 ft) in Peru and 2,300 m (7,500 ft) in Bolivia. They do not usually go above 3,500 m (11,500 ft) in both Peru and Bolivia. In Venezuela, they have much less variation in elevation, usually not going below 2,200 m (7,200 ft) or above 2,400 m (7,900 ft) there. They have been seen as low as 1,550 m (5,090 ft) in Venezuela. Sometimes, in bad weather, they can be seen at lower altitudes. They are recorded as mainly residing in forests, especially humid ones. They are most likely resident in their range.

== Behaviour ==
=== Breeding ===
Although when the females are fertile is unknown, it is known that the males are usually in breeding condition from July to September. It is likely that both males and females incubate the eggs.

This swallow most likely nests in burrows, like the similar blue-and-white swallow, in mossy cavities or in cavities created in roads. They prefer both subtropical and tropical montane forests and the upper cloud forest, avoiding clearings. They also prefer elfin forests, usually residing just above the altitudes where the blue-and-white swallow resides, in comparably more forested areas.

=== Diet ===
The pale-footed swallow is an aerial insectivore, eating insects in the air, usually over, and sometimes through, the forest canopy. They also forage over nearby clearings. Their flight is usually quick, low, and erratic. They are known to backtrack numerous times. These swallows usually forage in groups of 10–15, but sometimes 50 birds can be seen together. They usually do not perch, but when they do, they do so on bare, dead limbs of forest trees. They have been seen to forage with the similar blue-and-white swallow and the brown-bellied swallow.

== Status ==
This swallow is classified as least-concern by the IUCN. The justification for this is the fact that the population is stable, there are most likely more than 10,000 adults of this species, and they have a large range. The breeding range is estimated to be 2,730,000 km^{2} (1,050,000 mi^{2}). The population size is unknown, but it is apparently fairly common. Furthermore, it may be overlooked because of how similar it is to the blue-and-white swallow.
