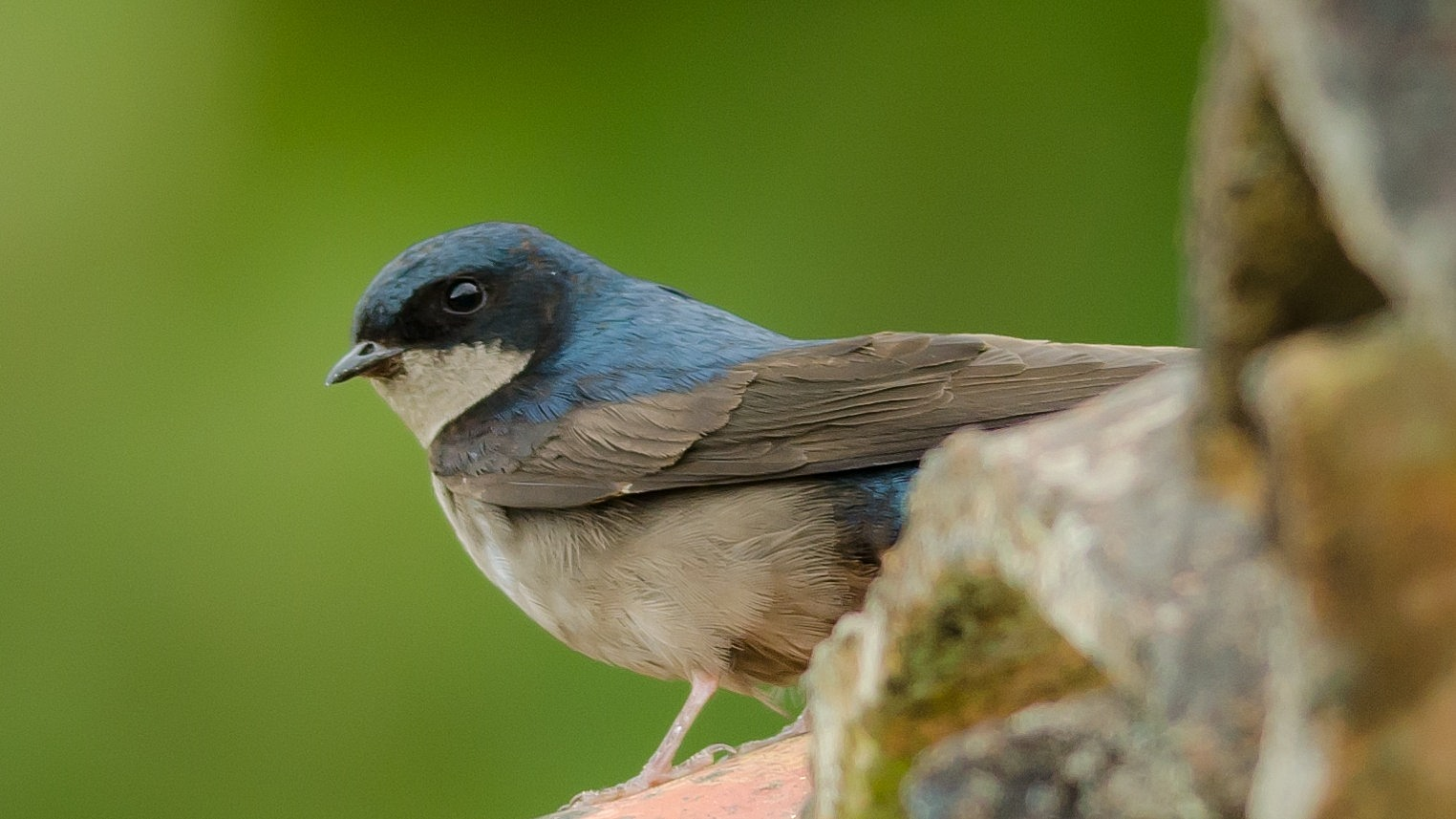
- Brown-bellied swallow (Orochelidon murina)

Scientific classification
- Kingdom: Animalia
- Phylum: Chordata
- Class: Aves
- Order: Passeriformes
- Family: Hirundinidae
- Genus: Orochelidon; Ridgway, 1903

Type species
- Petrochelidon murina brown-bellied swallow Cassin, 1853

= Orochelidon =

Genus of birds

Orochelidon is a genus of birds in the swallow family Hirundinidae. These species are resident in the Andes Mountains of South America.

== Taxonomy ==
The genus Orochelidon was introduced in 1903 by the America ornithologist Robert Ridgway with the brown-bellied swallow as the type species. The name combines the Ancient Greek oros meaning "mountain" and khelidōn meaning "swallow". The genus was formerly considered as a junior synonym of the genus Notiochelidon but was resurrected for a clade of Neotropical swallows based on a molecular phylogenetic study published in 2005.

=== Species ===
The genus contains the following three species:

Image	Common name	Scientific name	Distribution
	Pale-footed swallow	Orochelidon flavipes	Northern Andes, from Venezuela to Bolivia.
	Brown-bellied swallow	Orochelidon murina	Bolivia, Colombia, Ecuador, Peru, and Venezuela.
	Andean swallow	Orochelidon andecola	Argentina, Bolivia, Chile, and Peru.
