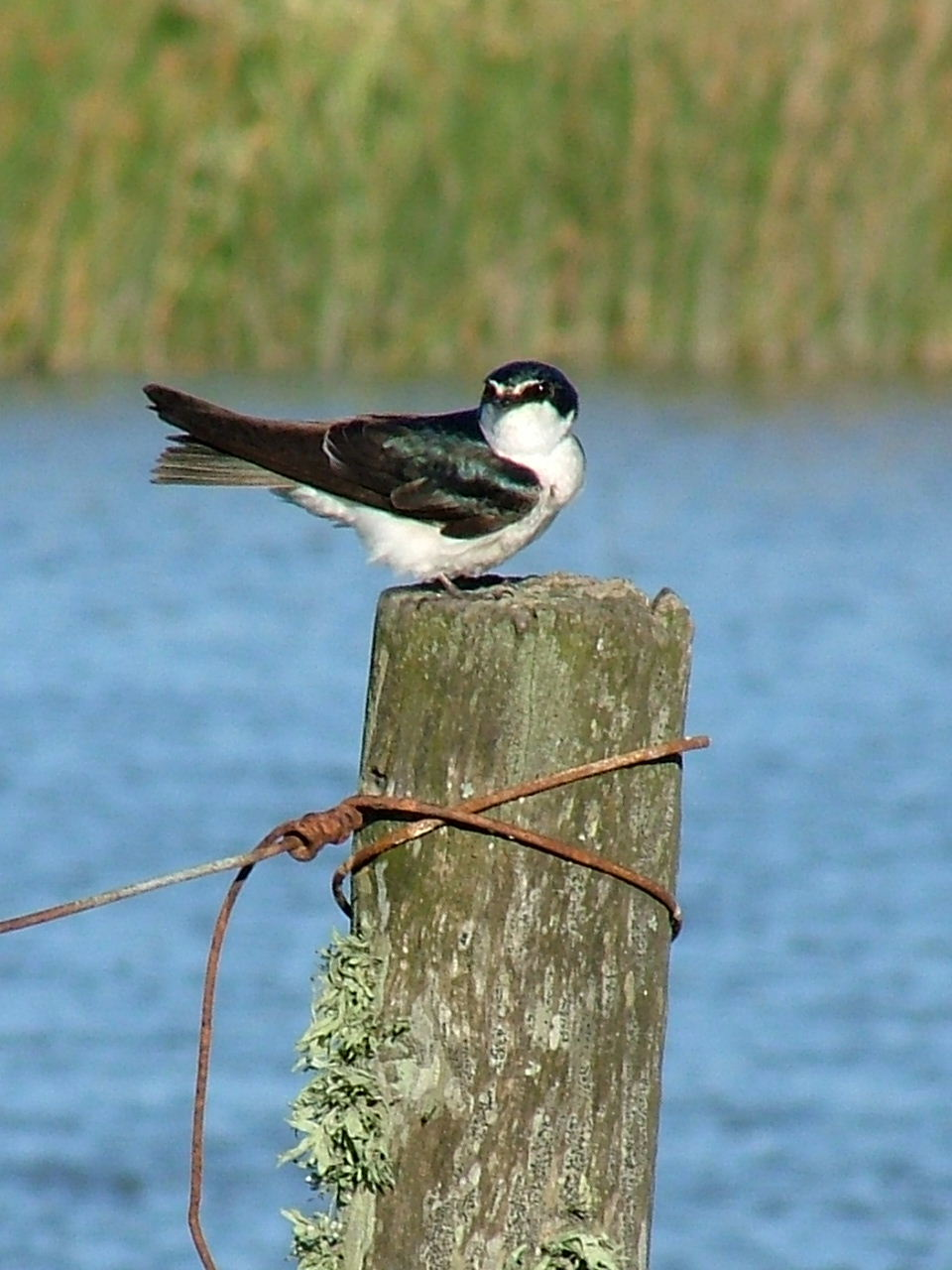
- In Buenos Aires

Conservation status
- Least Concern (IUCN 3.1)

Scientific classification
- Kingdom: Animalia
- Phylum: Chordata
- Class: Aves
- Order: Passeriformes
- Family: Hirundinidae
- Genus: Tachycineta
- Species: T. leucorrhoa

Binomial name
- Tachycineta leucorrhoa (Vieillot, 1817)
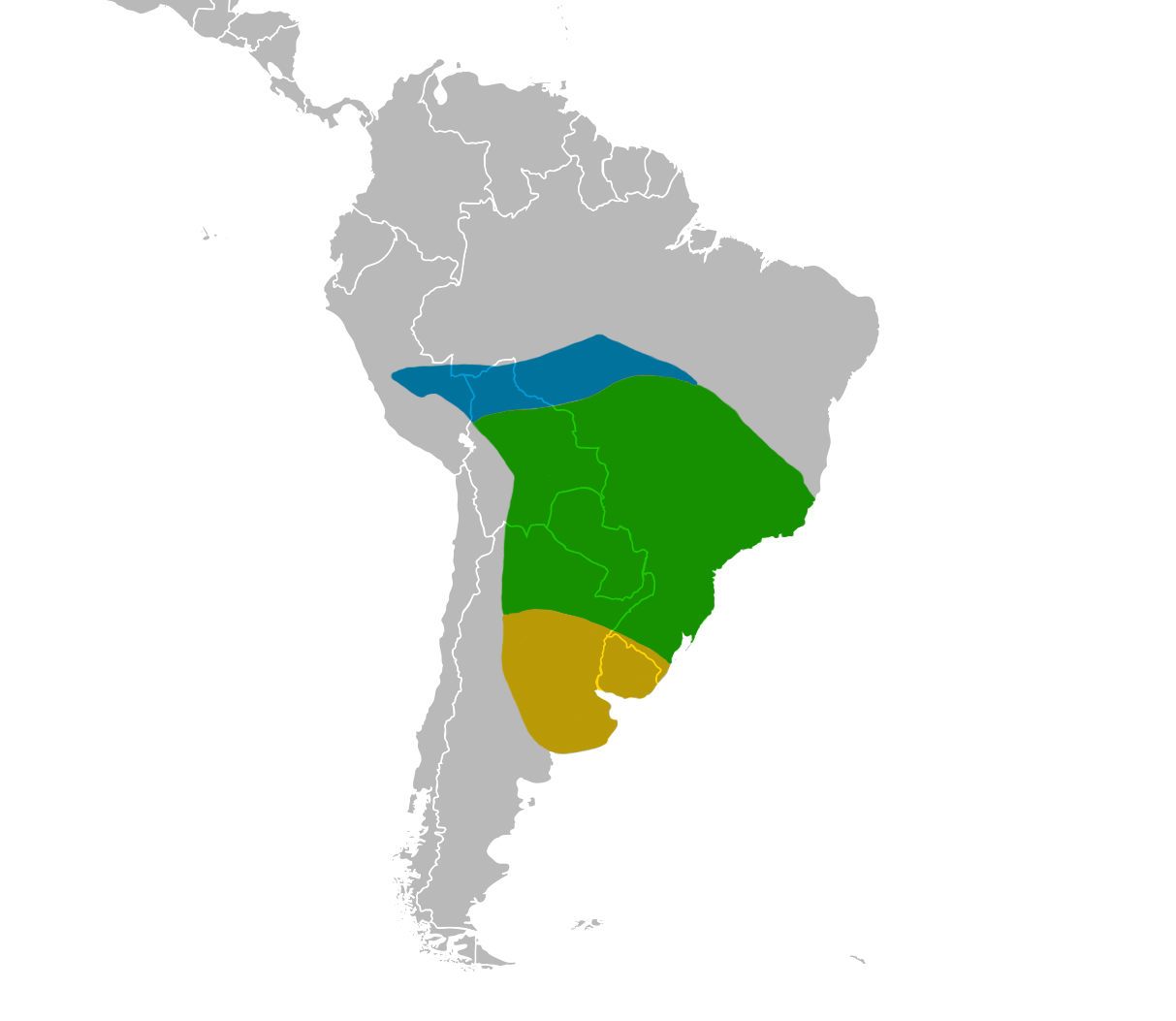
- Range of T. leucorrhoa Resident range Breeding visitor Winter visitor

= White-rumped swallow =

Species of bird

The white-rumped swallow (Tachycineta leucorrhoa) is a species of bird in the family Hirundinidae. First described and given its binomial name by French ornithologist Louis Pierre Vieillot in 1817, it was for many years considered a subspecies of the Chilean swallow. The species is monotypic with no known population variations. It has a white supraloral streak, or streak above its lores (the region between a bird's eye and nostrils), which can be used to differentiate it from the Chilean swallow. The lores, ear coverts, tail, and wings are black, with white tips on the inner secondaries, tertials, and greater coverts of the wings. The rest of the upperparts are a glossy blue. Its underparts and underwing-coverts are white, in addition to the rump, as the name suggests. The sexes are similar, and the juvenile is duller and browner with a dusky breast.

This species usually builds its nest in holes in trees or dead snags or under or in artificial structures like fence posts and the eaves of buildings. The white-rumped swallow is solitary and nests in distributed pairs during the breeding season. The breeding season is from October to December in Brazil and from October to February in neighboring Argentina. Usually, only one brood with four to seven eggs is laid, although a second one will occasionally be laid. The female incubates the eggs over a period usually between 15 and 16 days, with the fledging usually occurring between 21 and 25 days after hatching.

This swallow is found in Argentina, Bolivia, Brazil, Paraguay, Peru, and Uruguay. Its natural habitats are:

- dry savanna,
- pastureland,
- the edge of forests,
- subtropical or tropical seasonally wet or flooded lowland grassland.

It is classified as a least-concern species by the International Union for Conservation of Nature (IUCN). Its population is increasing and it may benefit from the increase in availability of artificial nest sites. The shiny cowbird is an occasional brood parasite of the white-rumped swallow.

== Taxonomy and etymology ==
The white-rumped swallow was first formally described as Hirundo albifrons by Uruguayan naturalist Dámaso Antonio Larrañaga in 1810, however it was not formally published until 1817 when French ornithologist Louis Pierre Vieillot independently named it Hirundo leucorrhoa in his Nouveau Dictionnaire d'Histoire Naturelle. Subsequently, it was moved to its current genus, Tachycineta, which was created in 1850 by Jean Cabanis. The binomial name is derived from Ancient Greek. Tachycineta is from takhukinetos, "moving quickly", and the specific leucorrhoa is from leukos, "white", and orrhos, "rump".

The species was formerly considered a subspecies of the Chilean swallow, most likely due to the similarity in morphology and calls. It is occasionally placed in the genus Iridoprocne with the tree swallow, mangrove swallow, white-winged swallow, and Chilean swallow. A study of the mitochondrial DNA of Tachycineta supports the split, although studies do show that the white-rumped swallow forms a superspecies, leucorrhoa, with the Chilean swallow. This species is monotypic, with no known subspecies.

This swallow is named for its white rump but it is also sometimes called the white-browed swallow, due to its white supraloral streak.

== Description ==
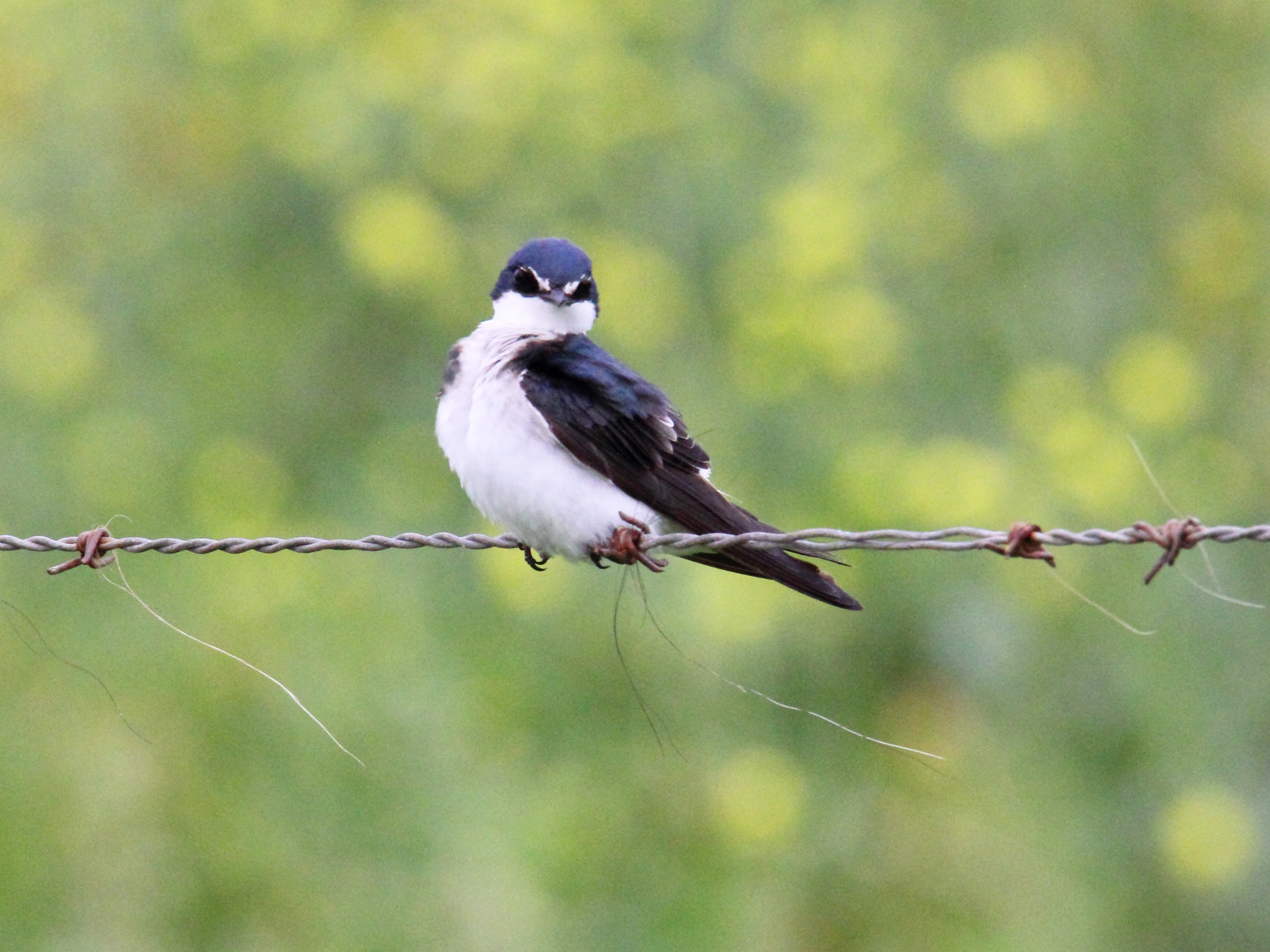
White-rumped swallow perching

The white-rumped swallow measures 13 centimetres (5.1 in) in length and weighs 17–21 grams (0.60–0.74 oz). It has an average wingspan of 115.7 millimetres (4.56 in). It has a white supraloral streak, a white streak above its eye, and black lores and ear coverts. The lores and ear-coverts have a blue-green gloss. It has black wings, with white tips on its inner secondaries, tertials, and greater wing-coverts. The white tips erode with age. The tail is black and has a shallow fork. The white-rumped swallow also has, as the name implies, a white rump. The rump is not totally white; it has some fine shaft streaks. The rest of the upperparts, in addition to the crown, nape, and forehead, are a glossy blue. These features, when this bird is not breeding, are more greenish-blue. The underparts and underwing-coverts are white. The bill, legs, and feet are black, and the irides are brown. The sexes are alike, and the juvenile can be distinguished by its dusky breast and the fact that it is duller and more brownish.

This swallow is similar to the Chilean swallow but can be differentiated by the Chilean swallow's lack of a supraloral white streak. The Chilean swallow also seems to keep its glossy blue upperparts when not breeding. The white-rumped swallow is, in addition, larger than the Chilean swallow.

The song of the white-rumped swallow is often described as a soft gurgling or a broken warble. It usually sings while flying at dawn. The call is described as a quick and toneless zzt. The alarm note it uses is short and harsh.

== Distribution ==
This swallow is native to Argentina, Bolivia, Brazil, Paraguay, Peru, and Uruguay. It inhabits open and semi-open country near water, the edge of woodland, and human settlements. It also occurs in dry savannas, degraded former forest, and both subtropical and tropical seasonally flooded grassland. It is additionally known to occur in the pampas of Argentina and Uruguay. During the austral winter, the birds in the southern population usually move to the northern parts of its range. This bird can be found at altitudes ranging from sea level to 1,100 metres (3,600 ft).

== Behaviour ==
After the breeding season, the white-rumped swallow forms flocks that sometimes consist of hundreds of individuals. These flocks frequently consist of both the white-rumped swallow and other species of swallows.

=== Breeding ===
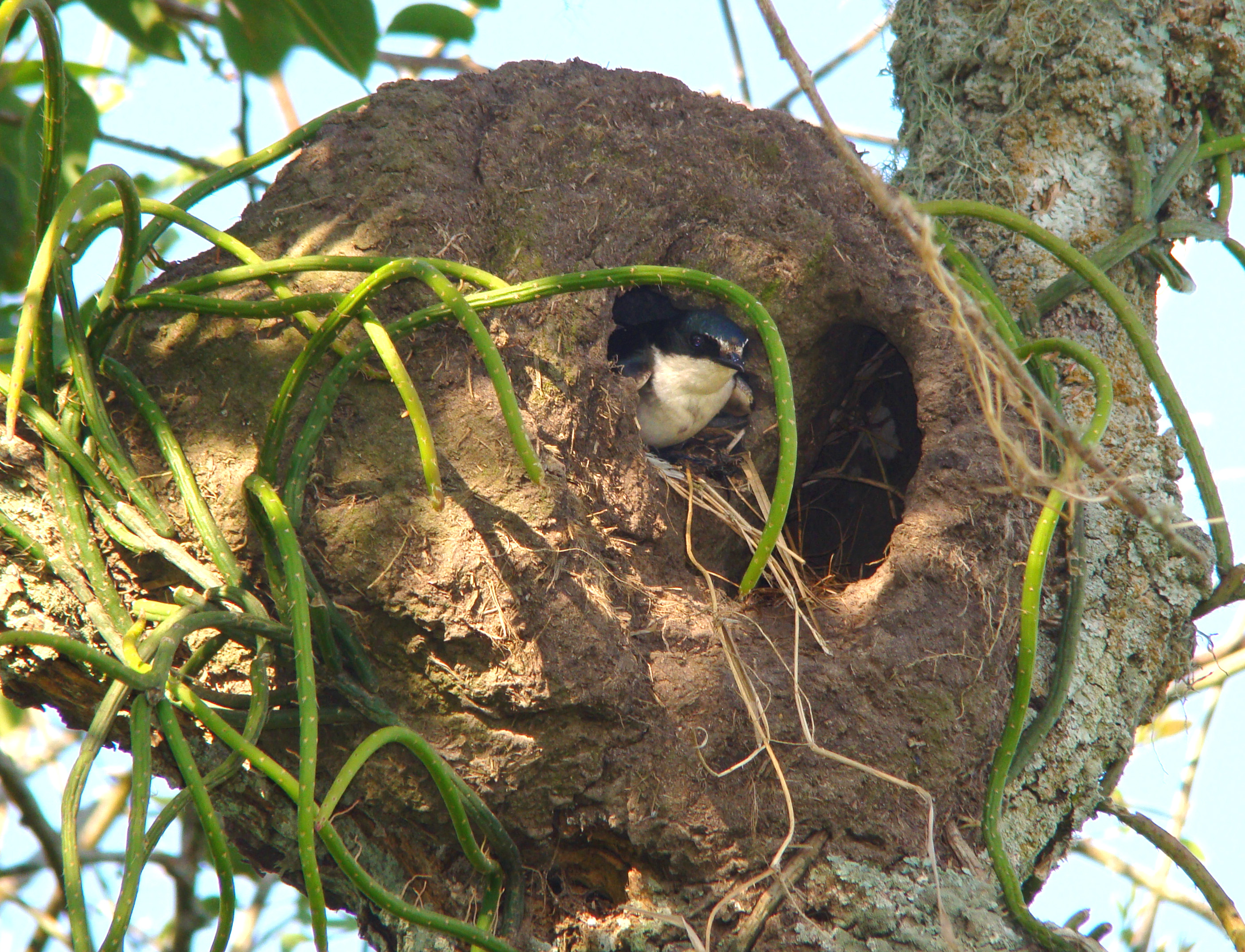
Using the abandoned nest of rufous hornero

The white-rumped swallow builds nests in holes or crevices in a tree or dead snag. It also builds them in artificial structures like holes in fence posts or under eaves, typically under those of abandoned buildings. This swallow will sometimes reuse favourable nest sites, which has a positive effect on fledgling survival. It occasionally nests in abandoned nests of the firewood-gatherer. The nests themselves are usually made of plant fibres and lined with hair and feathers. This swallow is solitary and, during the breeding season, is scattered in pairs. Pairs can be seen to fight and chase each other at the nest site.

This swallow displays nest prospecting behaviour, visiting potential future nesting sites. Nest prospecting is a behaviour recorded in both breeding and non-breeding individuals, and occurs both after the failure or success of a nest and while the bird is actively nesting. After a nest failure, the average distance an individual travels during a prospecting visit increases dramatically, from about 121 metres (397 ft) to about 5.1 kilometres (3.2 miles). Nest prospecting seems to occur more frequently in individuals with a smaller clutch size. Male visits to other nests could be to care for extra-pair young, although it does not explain female visits. Extra-pair young, or young with parents outside of the breeding pair, account for about 56 percent of all offspring.

The breeding season of the white-rumped swallow is from October to December in Brazil, and from October to February in Argentina. During this period, one brood is usually laid, although it will occasionally lay a second brood. On average, 58 percent of nests will fledge at least one chick.

The clutch is usually four to seven eggs that transition from pinkish-white when laid to pure white. The eggs measure 19.6 by 13.7 millimetres (0.77 in × 0.54 in) and weigh 1.9 grams (0.067 oz) on average. Clutch size and egg size are noted to usually decrease as the breeding season progresses. Late-season nestlings also weigh less than early-season nestlings. It takes 15 to 16 days for the female to incubate the clutch. About 58 percent of the broods hatch synchronously, although the hatching sometimes lasts over four days. On average, 78 percent of the eggs will hatch. The fledging period is 21 to 25 days, with about 95 percent of the nestlings fledging. The white-rumped swallow, on average, lives for 2.12 years. The male lives slightly longer than the female.

=== Diet ===
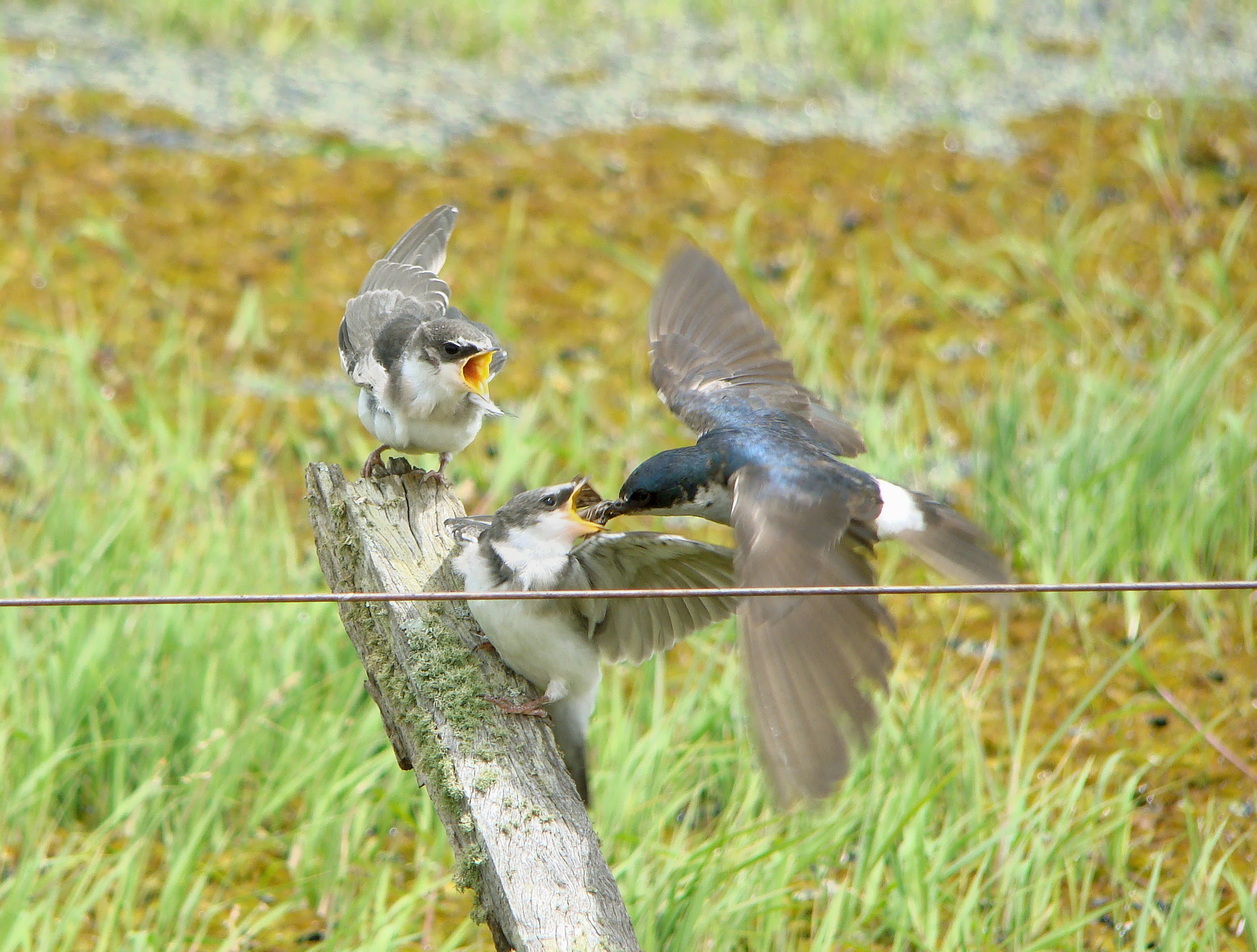
Juveniles being fed by adult in flight

The white-rumped swallow is an aerial insectivore that usually feeds alone or in small groups, feeding on flies, beetles, flying ants, Orthoptera, and Lepidoptera. It usually feeds close over water, pastures, and open woodland. Occasionally skimming the ground, its flight is fast and direct. It follows humans and other animals, and can usually be seen near humans and animals that are disturbing insects.

== Parasites ==
The shiny cowbird is a brood parasite that occasionally lays its eggs in the nest of white-rumped swallow. After a shiny cowbird fledges, it exhibits behaviour that causes it to be fed more, much to the detriment of white-rumped swallow nestlings. About six percent of nests are affected by this. This swallow has been known to lose nests to the southern house wren, a subspecies of the house wren.

== Conservation status ==
The white-rumped swallow is classified as a least-concern species by the IUCN. This is due to its large range, estimated to be 5,580,000 square kilometres (2,150,000 mi^{2}), its increase in population, and its large population. Increase in the availability of artificial nest sites may benefit this bird, and could be a factor in its increasing population. It is described as being fairly common in its range.
