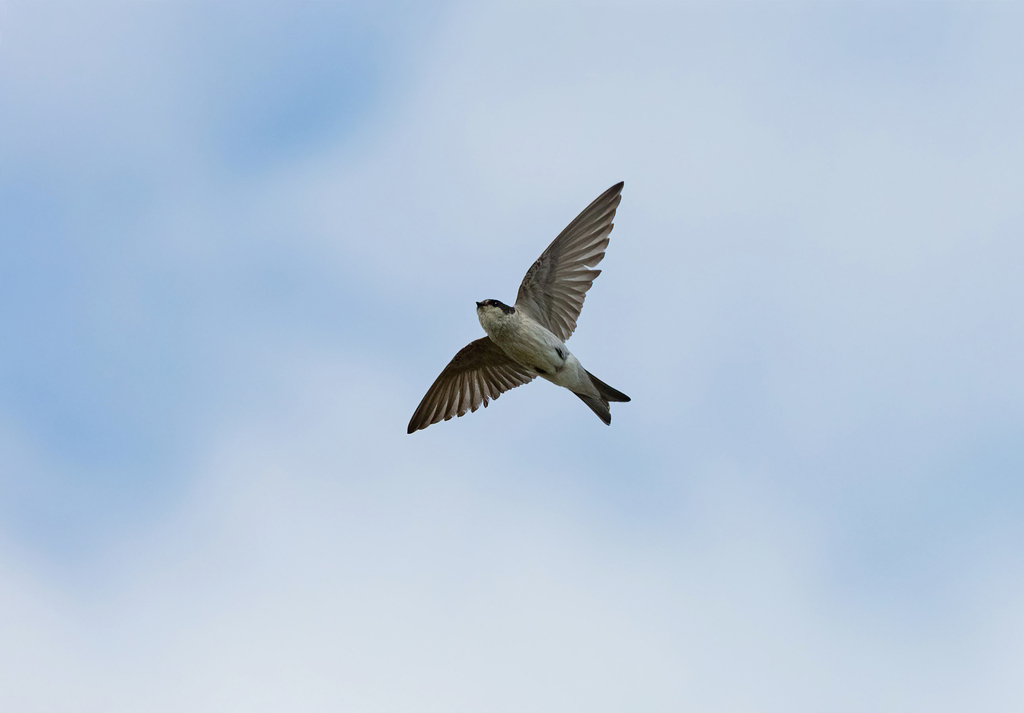

Conservation status
- Least Concern (IUCN 3.1)

Scientific classification
- Kingdom: Animalia
- Phylum: Chordata
- Class: Aves
- Order: Passeriformes
- Family: Hirundinidae
- Genus: Tachycineta
- Species: T. stolzmanni

Binomial name
- Tachycineta stolzmanni (Philippi, 1902)

= Tumbes swallow =

Species of bird

The Tumbes swallow (Tachycineta stolzmanni) is a species of bird in the family Hirundinidae, the swallows and martins. It is found in Ecuador and Peru.

== Taxonomy and systematics ==
The Tumbes swallow was first described as Hirundo leucopygia in 1880. However, that binomial already applied to a different species so in 1902, following the principle of priority, Philippi named it Hirundo Stolzmanni and is credited with its formal description. It later was moved to its present genus Tachycineta that had been erected in 1851. For much of the twentieth century it was treated as a subspecies of the mangrove swallow (Tachycineta albilinea) but by early in the twenty-first century it was widely accepted as a full species.

The Tumbes swallow is monotypic.

== Description ==
The Tumbes swallow is 11.5 to 12 cm (4.5 to 4.7 in) long and weighs about 11 g (0.39 oz). It is the smallest member of its genus. The sexes have the same plumage. Adults have a dark blue-brown to blue green head with a small white stripe from the base of the bill to above the eye and white cheeks and throat. Their upperparts, wings, and tail are dark blue-brown to blue green except for a white rump. Their underparts are white with thin bran-colored streaks on the breast. They have a dark iris, a stubby slate gray or black bill, and black legs and feet. Juveniles have mostly buff brown upperparts.

== Distribution and habitat ==
The Tumbes swallow is found from extreme southwestern Ecuador south into northwestern Peru as far as northern La Libertad Department. It inhabits arid regions with Prosopis trees, arid scrublands, and agricultural areas.

== Behavior ==
=== Feeding ===
The Tumbes swallow feeds only on insects that it captures in flight, though specific details of its diet are lacking.

=== Breeding ===
The Tumbes swallow's breeding season has not been fully defined but spans at least December to April. It appears to be socially monogamous. Its nest was first discovered in 1997, though most data on the species' breeding biology is from a study published in 2012. The species nests in tree cavities (mostly Prosopis species) and nest boxes. Nests are a cup made mostly from feathers with small amounts of dried grass, leaves, fur, and human-made materials such as plastic and string. The clutch averages about three eggs. The incubation period is 15 to 18 days and fledging occurs 26 to 32 days after hatch. Multiple clutches in a season are common. Up to four total have been noted; most are replacements for failed attempts. Both members of a pair vigorously defend the nest and provision nestlings.

=== Vocalization ===
As of December 2025 xeno-canto had only four recordings of Tumbes swallow vocalizations and the Cornell Lab of Ornithology's Macaulay Library had five with no overlap. "The mellifluous churtle of [the] breeding Tumbes Swallow is barely audible, but beautiful to the ear." Its call while foraging is "a dry, rising zhreet?".

== Status ==
The IUCN has assessed the Tumbes swallow as being of Least Concern. Its population size is not known but is believed to be stable. No immediate threats have been identified. It is very rare in Ecuador and "locally fairly common" in Peru. "Habitat degradation of seasonally dry tropical forests due to human activity (farming, grazing, settlement) may have adverse effects on populations of [the] Tumbes Swallow."
