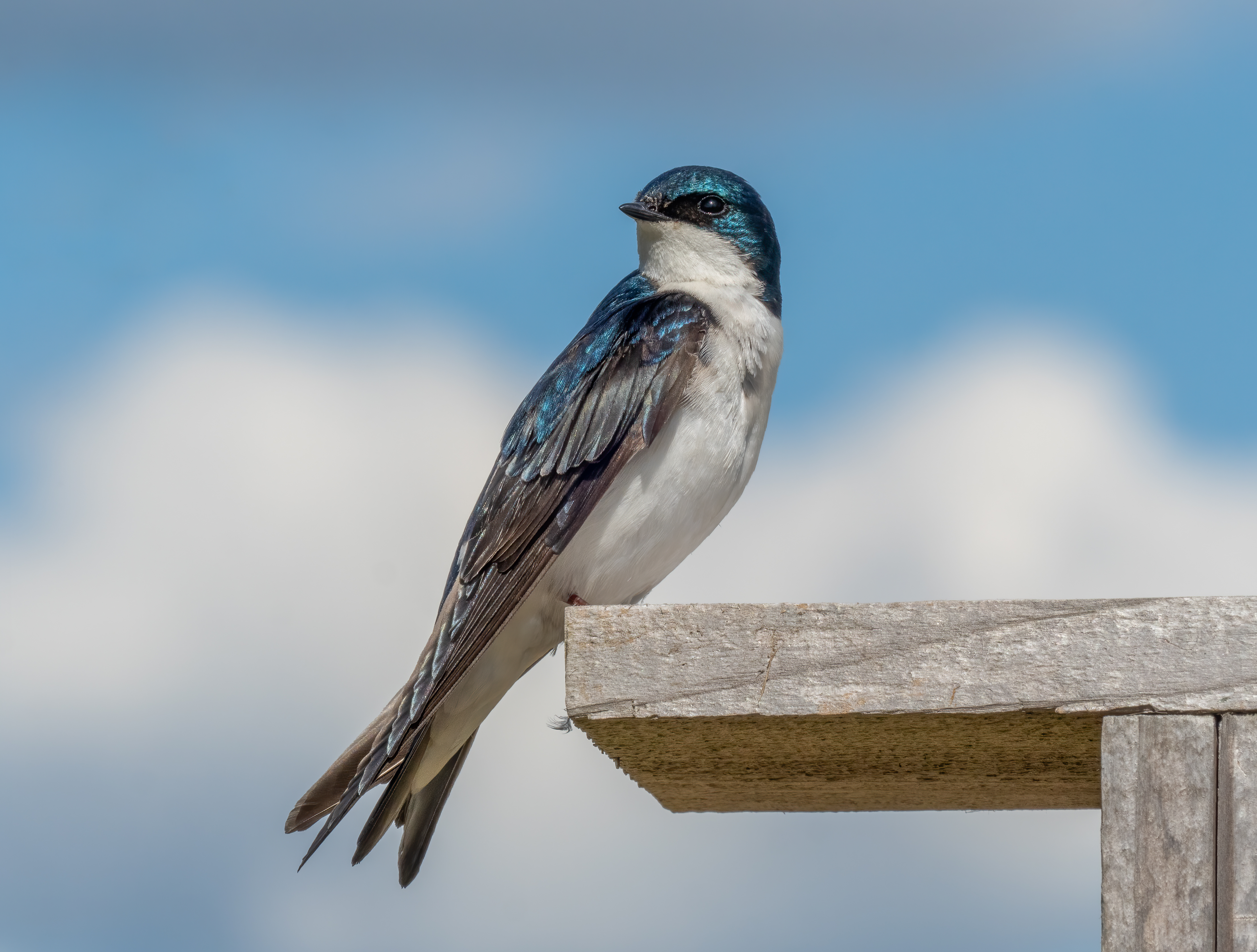
- Tree swallow (Tachycineta bicolor)

Scientific classification
- Kingdom: Animalia
- Phylum: Chordata
- Class: Aves
- Order: Passeriformes
- Family: Hirundinidae
- Subfamily: Hirundininae
- Genus: Tachycineta; Cabanis, 1851

Type species
- Hirundo thalassina Swainson, 1827

Species
- see text
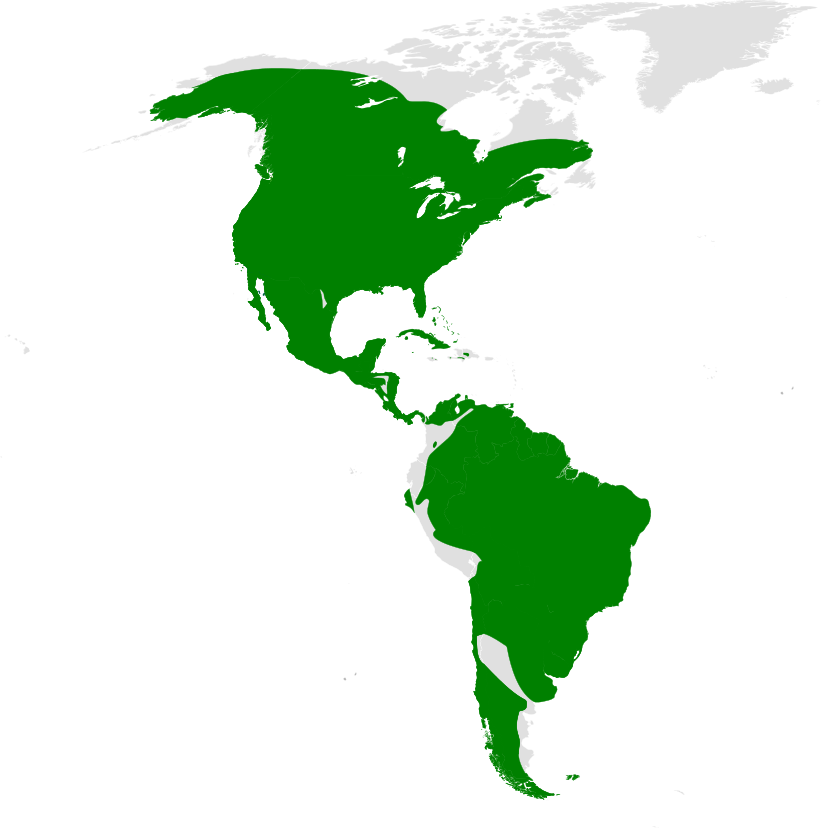
- Map includes former distribution in Jamaica

= Tachycineta =

Genus of birds

Tachycineta is a genus of birds in the swallow family Hirundinidae. There are nine described species all restricted to the Americas.

These are slender swallows with forked tails. Most species have a metallic green back, green or blue head, and metallic blue or unglossed brown wings. All have pure white underparts, and four species have a white rump.

Most Tachycineta swallows are at least partially migratory, with only golden and mangrove swallow being essentially resident. All the species use natural or disused cavities for nest sites.

== Taxonomy ==
The genus Tachycineta was introduced by the German ornithologists Jean Cabanisin 1850 with the violet-green swallow (Tachycineta thalassina) as the type species. The genus name is from Ancient Greek takhukinētos meaning "moving quickly".

The genus contains nine species, divided into two sub-clades that are associated with geography: a North American/Caribbean clade and a South/Central American clade.

Image	Common name	Scientific name	Distribution
	Tree swallow	Tachycineta bicolor	North-central Alaska and up to the tree line in Canada and as far south as Tennessee in the eastern part of its range, California and New Mexico in the west, and Kansas in the centre
	Bahama swallow	Tachycineta cyaneoviridis	Northern Bahamas: Andros, Grand Bahama, Abaco, and New Providence
	Violet-green swallow	Tachycineta thalassina	Central Alaska down to Mexico
	Golden swallow	Tachycineta euchrysea	Hispaniola and formerly Jamaica
	Mangrove swallow	Tachycineta albilinea	Native to Mexico and all of Central America (Belize, Guatemala, Honduras, El Salvador, Nicaragua, Costa Rica and Panama)
	White-rumped swallow	Tachycineta leucorrhoa	Argentina, Bolivia, Brazil, Paraguay, Peru, and Uruguay
	Chilean swallow	Tachycineta leucopyga	Argentina, Bolivia, Brazil, Chile, Falkland Islands, Paraguay, and Uruguay.
	Tumbes swallow	Tachycineta stolzmanni	Northwestern Peru and far southwestern Ecuador.
	White-winged swallow	Tachycineta albiventer	Tropical South America from Colombia, Venezuela, and Trinidad south to northern Argentina.
