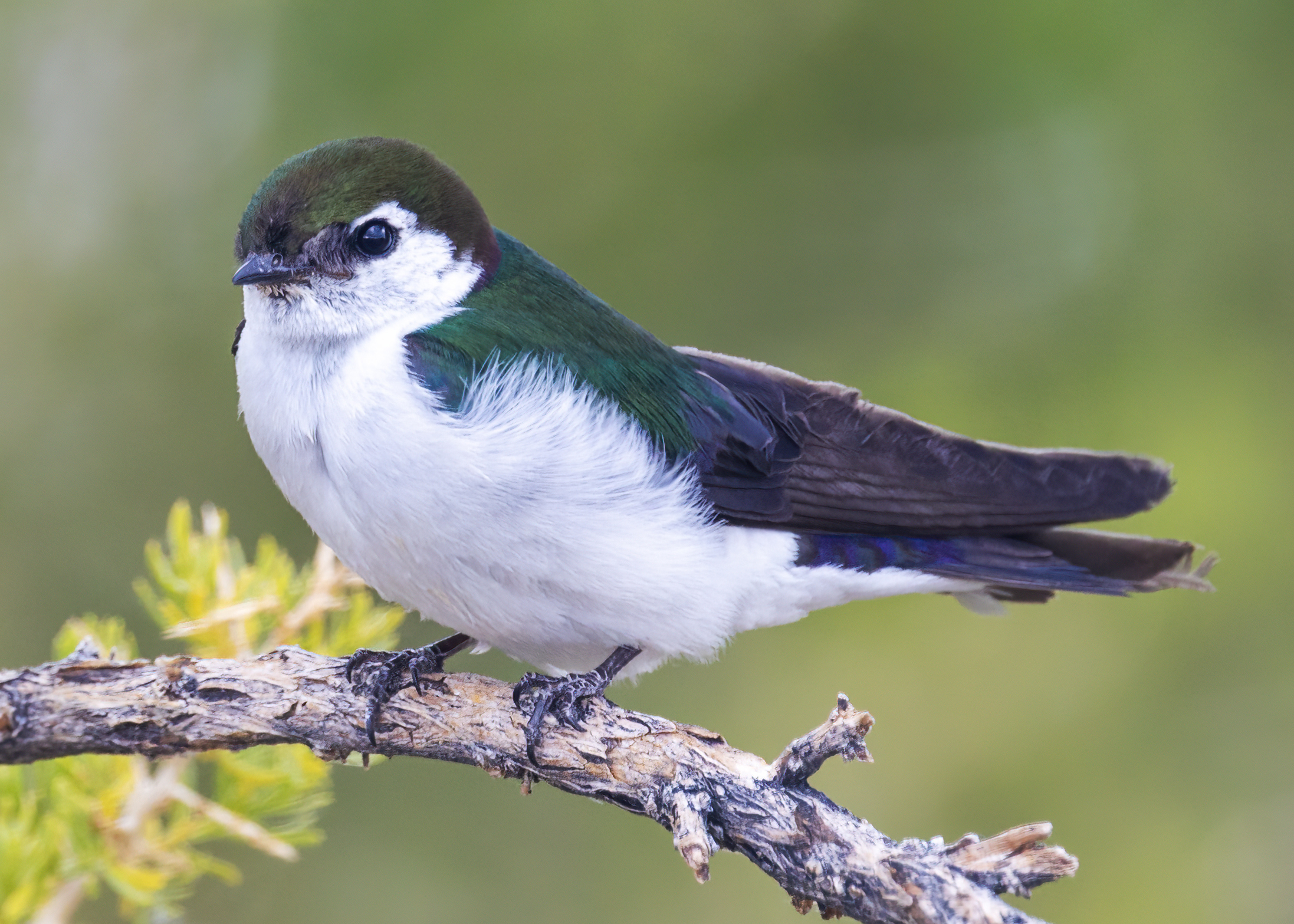
- Male at Mono Lake, California
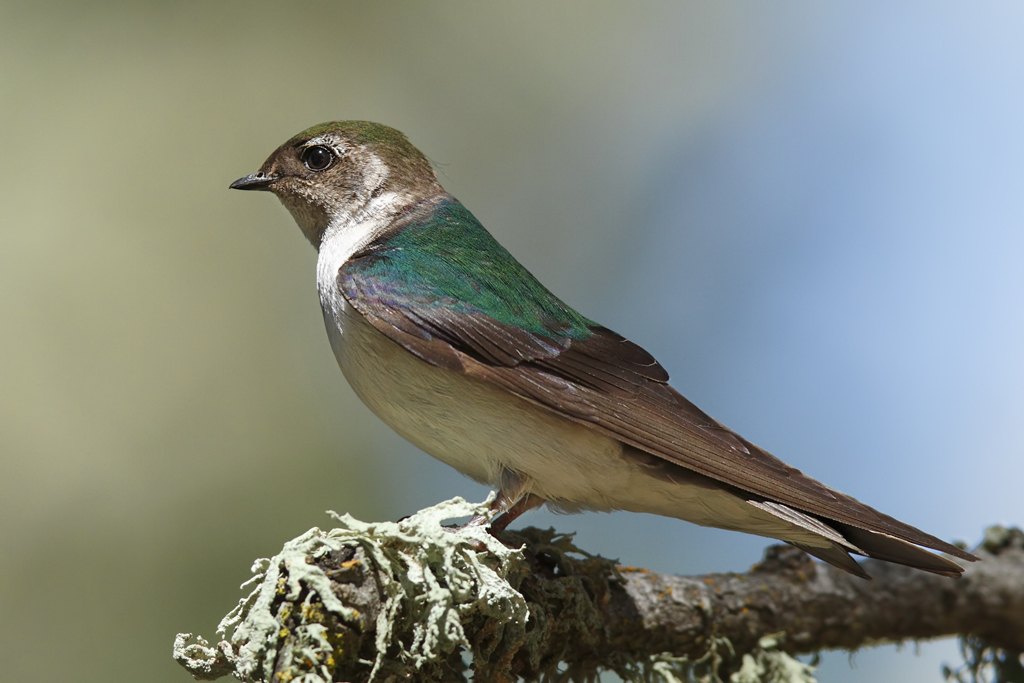
- Female in California, United States

Conservation status
- Least Concern (IUCN 3.1)

Scientific classification
- Kingdom: Animalia
- Phylum: Chordata
- Class: Aves
- Order: Passeriformes
- Family: Hirundinidae
- Genus: Tachycineta
- Species: T. thalassina

Binomial name
- Tachycineta thalassina (Swainson, 1827)

Subspecies
- T. t. thalassina; T. t. brachyptera
- Violet : resident area Orange : breeding area Blue : nonbreeding area Yellow : migration

= Violet-green swallow =

Species of bird

The violet-green swallow (Tachycineta thalassina) is a small North American passerine bird in the swallow family. These aerial insectivores are distributed along the west coast from Alaska to Mexico, extending as far east as Montana and Texas. With an appearance very similar to the tree swallow, these individuals can be identified by the white rump side-patches that appear to separate their green back and purple tail. Violet-green swallows are secondary cavity nesters, found in a number of habitats including deciduous and coniferous forest. In addition to nesting in tree holes within these habitats, they are also widely observed nesting in the cracks of large cliffs.

== Description ==
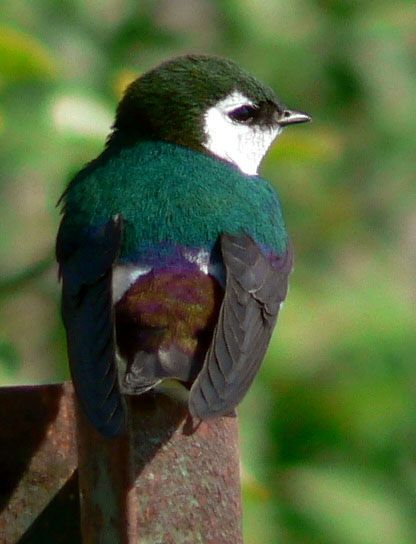
Back and rump details

The distinct body form of swallows distinguishes them from other passerine birds. Their long pointed wings and slim, streamlined body evolved to catch insects while in flight; the violet-green swallow is no exception. With an average body length of 12–13 cm (4.7–5.1 in), the violet-green swallow is slightly shorter and appears more compact in flight compared to some other members of the genus Tachycineta. The violet-green swallow most closely resembles the tree swallow T. bicolor, but can be distinguished by the more extensive white on the sides of the rump, and its green-and-violet glossed colour.

=== Colours ===
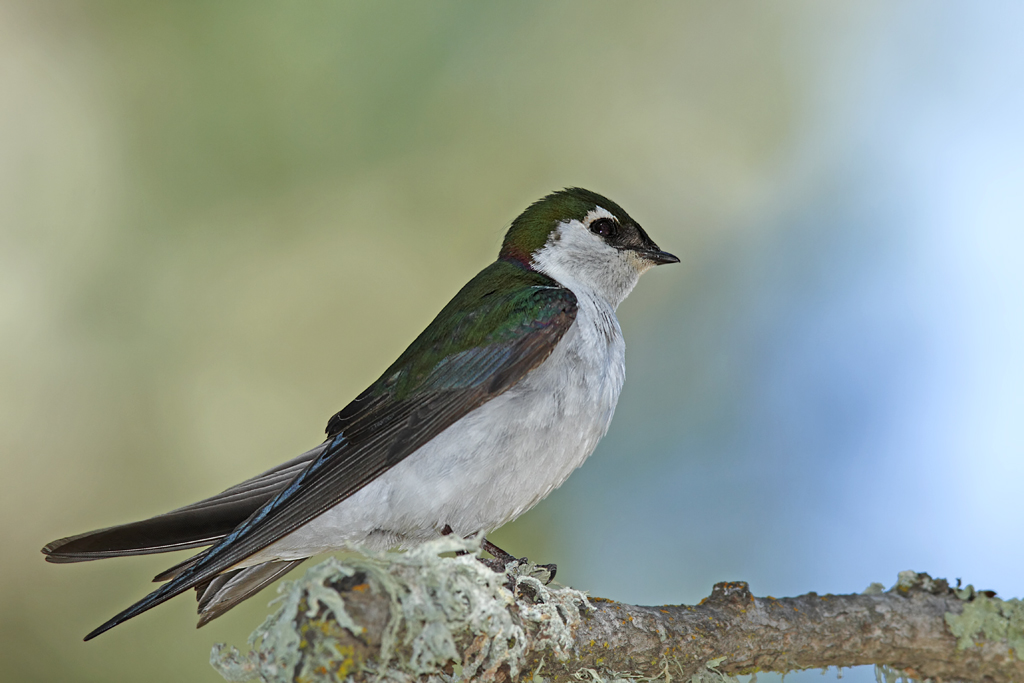
Male in California, U.S.

The violet-green swallow gets its name from the iridescent colours on its back and rump. The species is best identified by the glossy green on the top of the head and back as well as hints of purple on the nape, rump and upper tail. Below the green back, the remainder of the wing is a greyish-bronze. Similar to many other swallows, it is white below, but differs in that the white continues onto rump side-patches that almost meet at the base of the tail. These white rump side-patches sometimes look like one continuous stripe when in flight. White also extends onto the cheeks, partially surrounding the eye. The notch in the tail of the violet-green swallow is slightly shallower than that of the tree swallow, but deeper than the relatively flat tail of the cliff swallow.

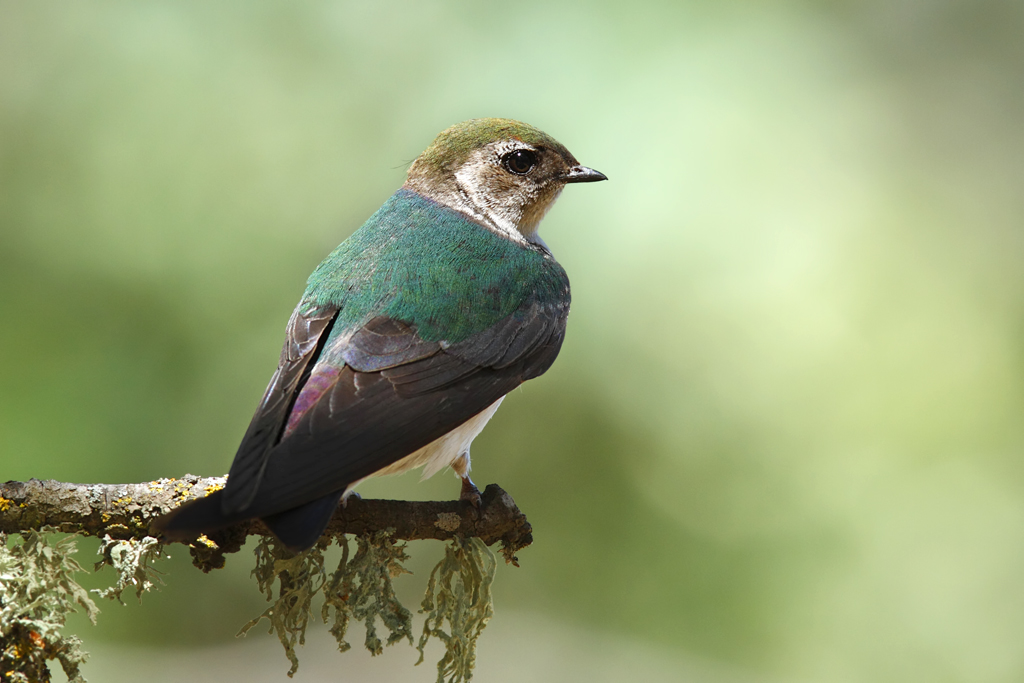
Female in California, U.S.

Violet-green swallows exhibit more sexual dimorphism than many other swallows, with adult males showing brighter colours than adult females. Additionally, the white cheeks are not as prominent and the head is more bronze than green on the female. The females are however variable; while most are obviously duller, some are nearly as bright as males. Juveniles are not as easily identifiable compared to adults due to their duller colours. Similar to other juvenile swallows, especially the tree swallow, the juvenile violet-green swallow is white below and greyish-brown above. However, the more gradual change in colour and visible (but slightly reduced) white cheek patches can help identify juvenile individuals of the species.

=== Standard measurements ===
	Male	Female
Bill length (mm)	5.1	5.2
Wing length (mm)	113.9	107.9
Tail length (mm)	46.0	43.7
Tarsal length (mm)	11.7	11.8
Longest toe (mm)	13.2	13.3
Mass (g)	14.4	13.9
Wingspan	27 cm	27 cm

== Taxonomy ==
The swallows have been well studied ecologically, but only recently has their phylogeny been thoroughly researched. Swallows are passerine birds grouped within the family Hirundinidae. The family Hirundinidae is split into two subfamilies, Pseudochelidoninae, which contains two species of river martins, and Hirundininae, comprising all other martins and swallows. The 82 species within the subfamily Hirundininae are further classified into three groupings; the mud nesters, basal relicts, and core martins, with the violet-green swallow falling into the last group. Violet-green swallows are one of nine species of New World tree swallows within the genus Tachycineta. This genus is a monophyletic group and is considered the sister taxon of a group of other swallow genera restricted to the New World.

Violet-green swallows are important members of the genus Tachycineta due to their large geographic range and because they are one of the two species that breed within North America. It is generally agreed that Tachycineta is split into two clades, one in North America and one in South America, but the phylogenetic placement within the genus depends on the type of analysis used. The violet-green swallow is a member of the North American grouping, along with T. bicolor (the North American tree swallow), T. euchrysea (the golden swallow of Hispaniola and Jamaica) and T. cyaneoviridis (the Bahama swallow). A mitochondrial genome analysis has placed T. thalassina as a sister taxon of the Caribbean swallows, T. euchrysea and T. cyaneoviridis, with all three species forming a sister clade to T. bicolor. Nuclear genome analyses and a consensus of both methods have reorganized this North American clade, alternating the closest sister taxon of T. thalassina between T. cyaneoviridis and T. euchrysea. Nonetheless, the taxonomy of the violet-green swallow is well understood up to the genus level, after which some uncertainty surrounds the placement of T. thalassina within the North American clade of the genus Tachycineta.

=== Subspecies ===
Violet-green swallows are divided into two subspecies, T. t. thalassina and T. t. brachyptera, differing in breeding ranges and wing length. T. t. thalassina, which occupies most of the species range, has slightly longer wings; it has been known to breed as far north as Alaska. The shorter winged T. t. brachyptera breeds further south in western Mexico in Baja California and Sonora. A third subspecies T. t. lepida formerly sometimes accepted is no longer considered distinct.

=== Hybridization ===
Hybridization has been known to occur among the swallows, with a few cases involving violet-green swallows being reported. Breeding between violet-green swallows and both tree and barn swallows has been recorded on separate occasions, but resulting offspring were not observed. In 2000, the strange plumage of a swallow seen in British Columbia, Canada, suggested the possible successful hybridization of a violet-green and a cliff swallow. Nonetheless, these observations are rare, which accounts for the minimal research into swallow hybridization.

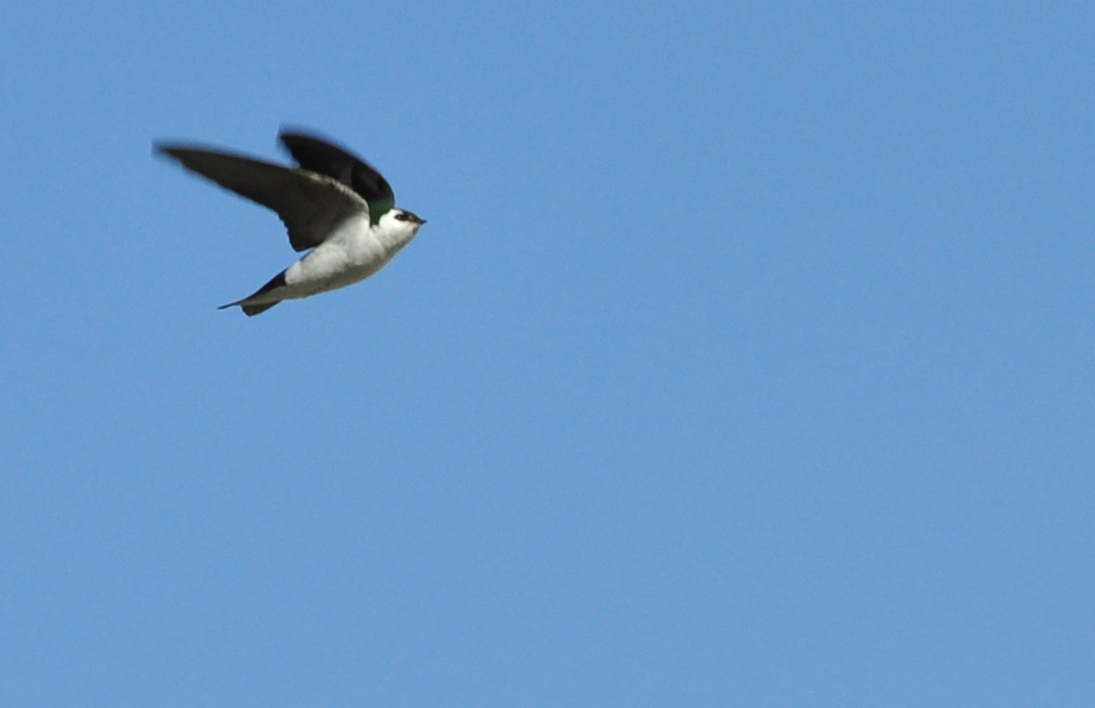
A violet-green swallow in flight

== Habitat ==
The type of habitat occupied by violet-green swallows varies depending on their geographical location and elevation. Across their range, these birds can be found in deciduous, coniferous and mixed forests, as well as within canyons and in close proximity to large cliffs. Breeding and non-breeding habitats do not differ much except that breeding habitat is usually at lower elevations. Violet-green swallows have also been observed nesting around buildings in more settled areas.

== Distribution ==
Violet-green swallows are a predominantly western North American species, with the rare sighting of individuals in eastern North America. The distribution of the species can be divided on the basis of the recognized subspecies, but the entire range spans from central Alaska down to Mexico. Longitudinally, the range borders the west coast of Alaska, British Columbia and the United States, and extends eastward into southwestern Alberta, Montana, the Dakotas and Texas. The breeding range spans almost the entire distribution, while the winter range is restricted to Mexico.

== Behaviour ==
=== Vocalizations ===
There are many knowledge gaps surrounding the vocalization behaviour of violet-green swallows. These gaps include vocalizations made during early development, alarm calls and the daily pattern of calls. The little information available suggests two main classes of vocalizations, the chee-chee calls and twitter calls.

	Chee-chee calls	Twitter calls
Syllables	Mono- or bi-syllabic	Monosyllabic
Frequency (kHz)	2.5 - ≥7.0	2.0 – 6.5
Duration (ms)	165	125
Repetition	Pairs of series	No recognizable pattern
Intervals (ms)	85 – 165	Unknown

==== Chee-chee calls ====
This call is most commonly heard when one violet-green swallow interacts with another swallow, either during foraging, in-flight chases or when approaching a nesting site. Flocks of swallows have been recorded making chee-chee calls, suggesting its use in social cohesion. Juveniles have also been observed making this vocalization when waiting to be fed by an adult, implying that it plays a role in parent-juvenile recognition.

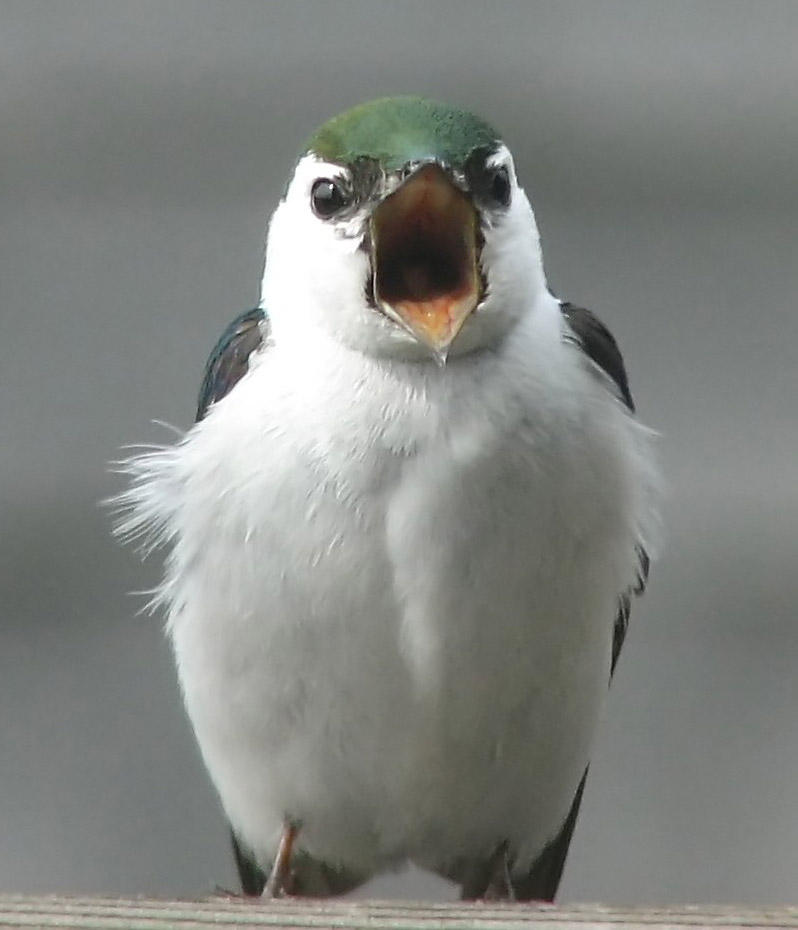
Violet-green swallow calling

==== Twitter calls ====
Observations of violet-green swallows making twitter calls typically associate the vocalization with courtship displays and the establishment of new territories. Twitter calls have only been heard in flight, either by a male escorting a female or during brief intraspecific territorial disputes. Mixing of the two calls occurs occasionally, but little ecological research can explain its use.

=== Diet ===
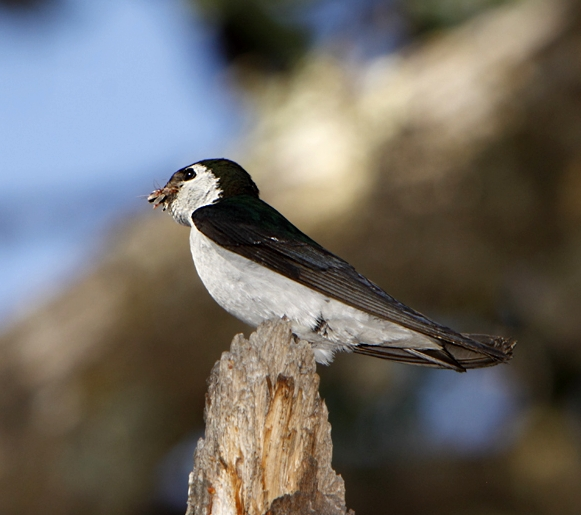
Violet-green swallow with a beak full of insects

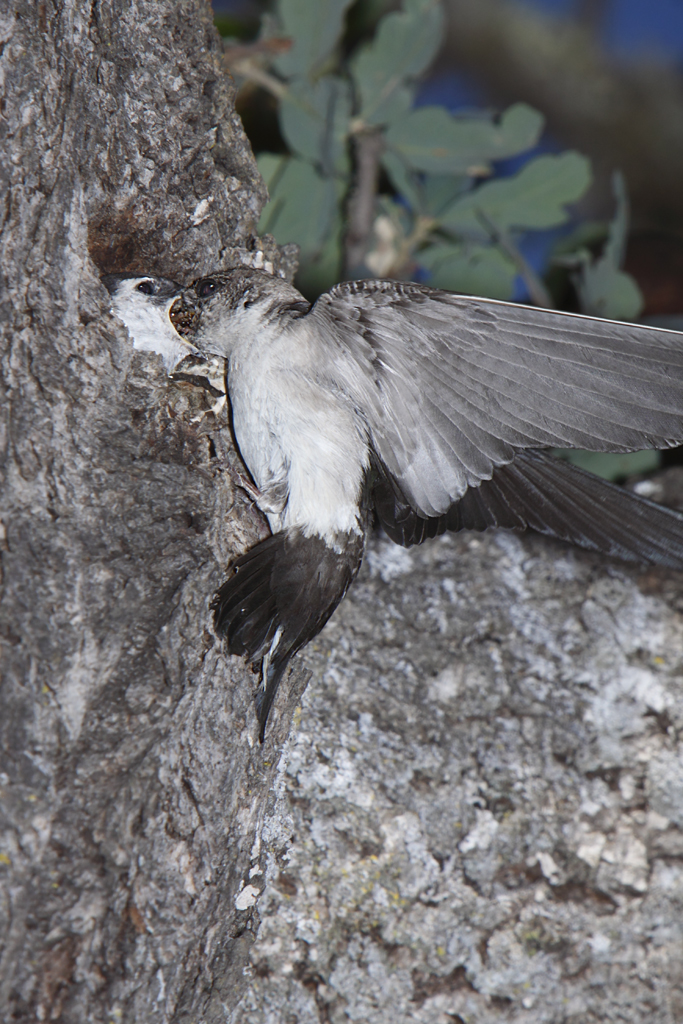
A female violet-green swallow feeding her chick from outside their tree hole nest

Similar to other swallows, violet-green swallows are specialized aerial insectivores, catching and eating their prey while in flight. However, they have been known to feed higher in the sky than most other swallows. The examination of the stomach contents of multiple individuals has presented a wide range of diet items, including insects like ants, beetles and flies as well as other arthropods such as spiders. On rare occurrences these birds have been observed foraging along the ground, but such events represent exceptions to their typical feeding habits.

=== Reproduction ===
Violet-green swallows will usually arrive at their breeding area weeks prior to the start of reproduction. Location dependent, copulation takes place mid-May with the eggs being laid by the start of June, followed by a couple weeks of incubation before hatching. The average clutch size is 5 eggs, with females laying approximately 1 per day. During the weeks post-hatching, the parents feed their young as they slowly begin to grow their feathers. After approximately three weeks the young are ready to leave the nest. It is more common for pairs to reproduce once per breeding season, but a second brooding has been observed on occasion.

==== Nesting sites ====
Violet-green swallows are secondary cavity nesters, meaning they typically nest in natural holes or previously occupied nests. Some breeding pairs will even go as far as usurping nests from other species. A majority of violet-green swallow nests are in tree holes excavated by other animals or within the cracks of large cliffs. Due to their dependence on large trees, violet-green swallows are highly impacted by forest management practices. In addition to nesting in natural cavities, violet-green swallows have also been observed occupying artificial nest boxes. Pairs typically breed in independent nests, except on cliffs where large colonies can be found nesting together.

==== Interspecific egg-dumping ====
Violet-green swallows have been observed cooperating and competing with various avian species, including western bluebirds. A similar field observation notes a violet-green swallow laying an egg in an active bluebird nest box. Initially, the male bluebird attempted to drive the swallow from the nest cavity, while the female bluebird did not seem concerned with the intruder. It appeared the bluebirds tolerated the act of egg-dumping by the violet-green swallow, but the observer returned the following day to find the newly laid egg smashed below the nest. This behaviour suggests that when unable to access her original nest after physiologically committing to laying her egg, a female violet-green swallow may participate in interspecific egg-dumping.

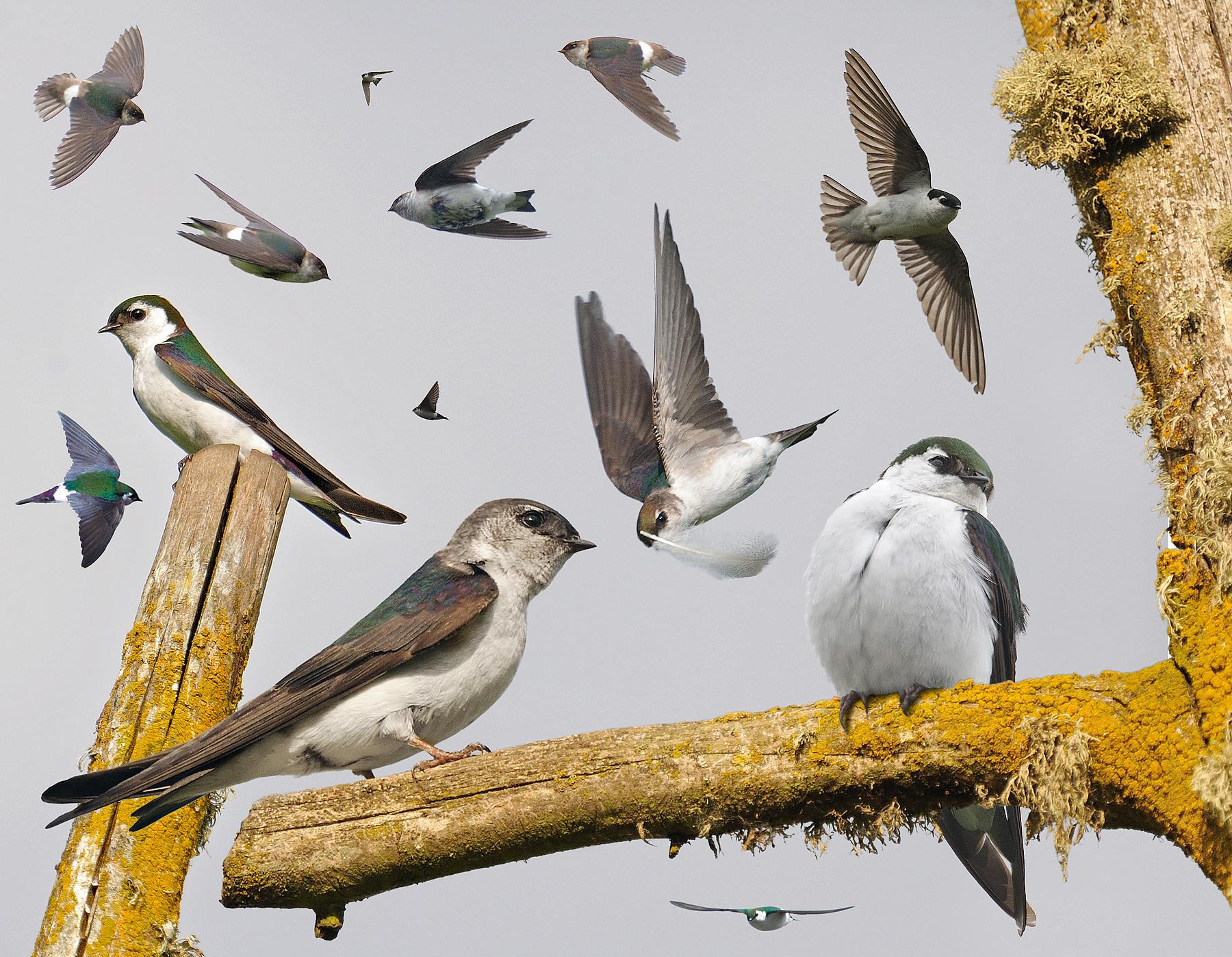
Violet-green swallow from The Crossley ID Guide: Eastern Birds

==== Intraspecific paternity-defence ====
Violet-green swallows are secondary cavity nesters and aerial insectivores, making males susceptible to nest and mate competition. To avoid being cuckolded, males spend more time guarding their mate than their nest, contrary to tree swallows. This paternity-defence behaviour emphasizes that non-territorial violet-green swallows exhibit greater mate competition than nesting site competition.

=== Interspecific cooperation ===
Multiple accounts of violet-green swallows forming cooperative relationships with other species have been recorded. From 1981 to 1982, three independent swallow pairs were observed co-occupying the nest boxes of western bluebirds. These violet-green swallows protected the nesting site, removed fecal sacs from the boxes and fed the bluebird fledglings with no resistance from the adult western bluebirds. Despite too small of a sample size to hold statistical significance, fledgling survival was greater when violet-green swallows provided active care. It is believed that the swallows benefit from the cooperative relationship by inheriting the nest box after the bluebird parents and fledglings have left.

=== Interspecific competition ===
Similar to the occasional observation of violet-green swallows building interspecific cooperative relationships, they have also been involved in interspecific competition for nesting sites. One example from 1974 noted the competitive behaviour between mountain chickadees and violet-green swallows. The physical altercation began when a pair of swallows attempted to overtake a nesting site occupied by a pair of chickadees and their fledglings. After multiple aerial battles, the chickadees regained control of their nest and successfully defended against future violet-green swallow attacks. The same field observer noted a similar altercation between violet-green swallows and hairy woodpeckers, which resulted in the same outcome. These species are permanent residents, allowing them first choice of nesting sites, while the violet-green swallows are summer residents with late breeding habits. Thus, a scarcity of viable nesting sites may lead to this interspecific competitive behaviour in violet-green swallows. A similar observation of competitive behaviour for potential nesting sites has been observed between acorn woodpeckers and violet-green swallows.

=== Torpor ===
It has been speculated that certain birds, including swallows, enter a state of torpidity during harsh winter conditions. Few observations of this decrease in body temperature and metabolic rate have been recorded in violet-green swallows, the first case occurring in 1965 near Death Valley National Monument in Saratoga Springs, California. Field observers noted three "dead" individuals on the east-facing slope of a dune the morning after a cold and windy night. Upon closer observation, the violet-green swallows made minor movements, such as opening their eyes, but did not struggle while being handled. The physical appearance of the swallows, including the position of their head in relation to the slope and the fluffing of their feathers was similar to that of other birds in torpor. Despite the lack of thermometers, it was apparent these three individuals were in a state of hypothermia for about 45 minutes after the sun began to rise. Eventually the three swallows awkwardly flew off, signifying the end of their torpor bout.

=== Ectoparasite control ===
==== Sunbathing ====
In addition to reaching borderline hypothermic temperatures during bouts of torpor, violet-green swallows have been observed behaving similar to hyperthermic individuals while sunbathing. Indications of this activity include the orientation of their wings and tail, their trance-like state and the occasional loss of balance. Research has shown that increasing feather temperatures during basking can control ectoparasites. The period of sunbathing in violet-green swallows is short and dependent on ambient temperature and wind velocity, but typically occurs after an increase in parasite loads near the end of nesting.
