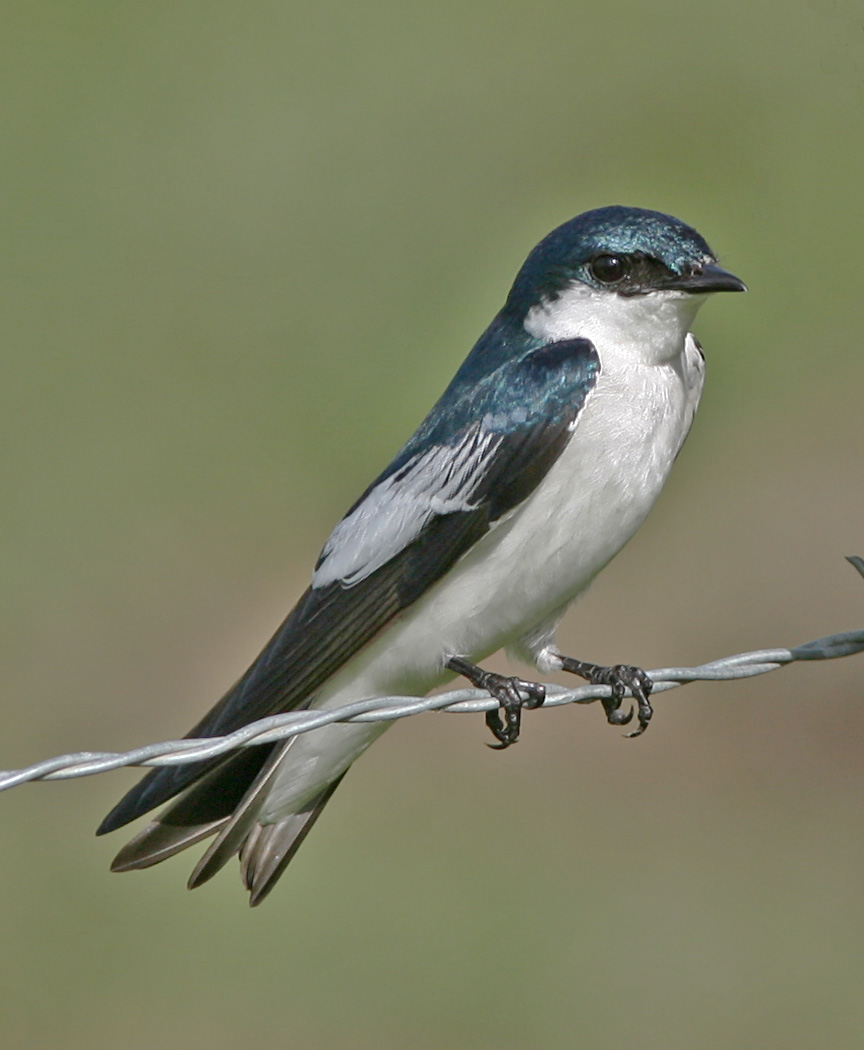
- at rest in the Llanos, Venezuela

Conservation status
- Least Concern (IUCN 3.1)

Scientific classification
- Kingdom: Animalia
- Phylum: Chordata
- Class: Aves
- Order: Passeriformes
- Family: Hirundinidae
- Genus: Tachycineta
- Species: T. albiventer

Binomial name
- Tachycineta albiventer (Boddaert, 1783)

= White-winged swallow =

Species of bird

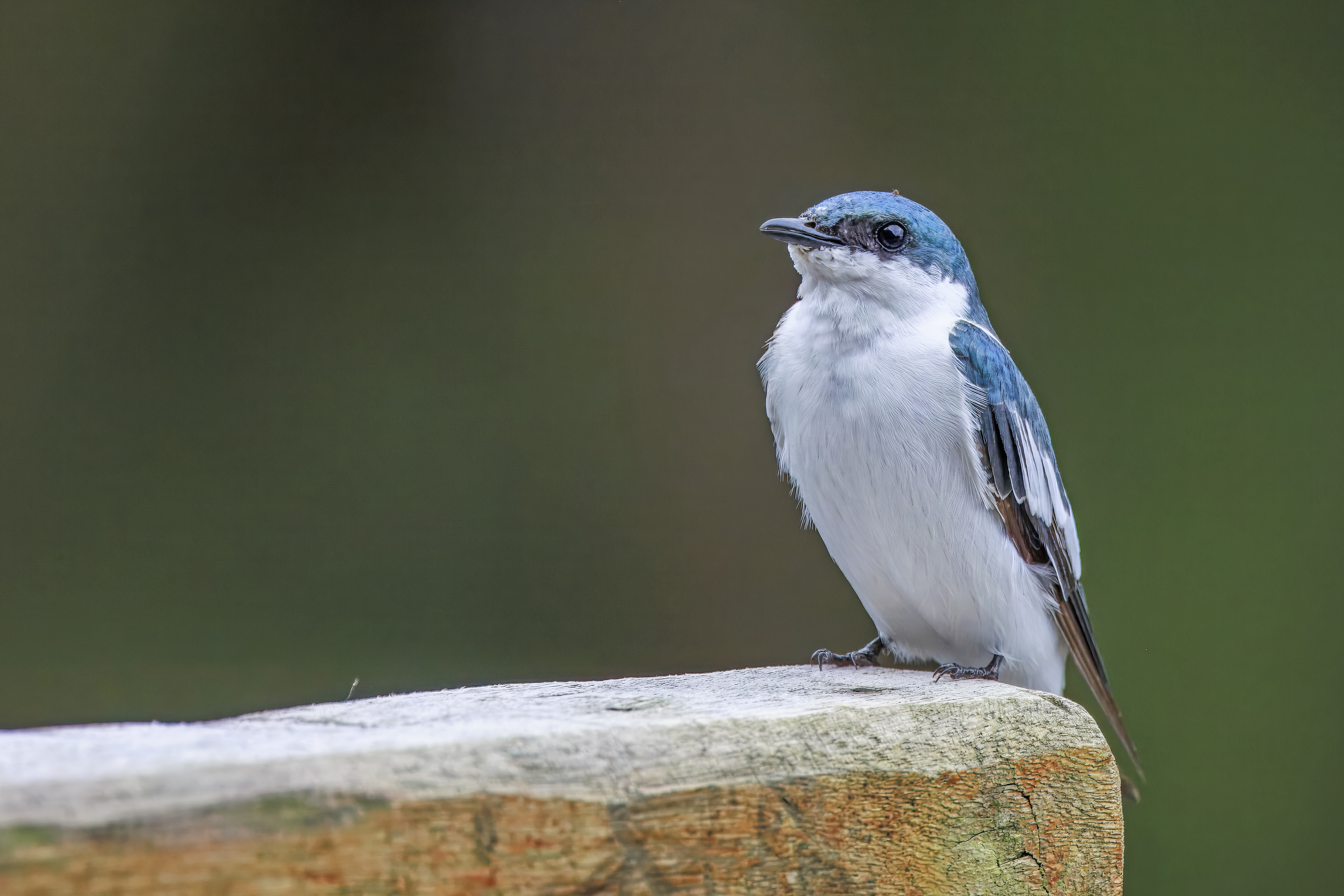
in Ecuador

The white-winged swallow (Tachycineta albiventer) is a resident breeding swallow in tropical South America found in Brazil, Colombia, Venezuela, Trinidad, and Argentina. It is not found west of the Andes. This swallow is largely non-migratory.

== Taxonomy ==
The white-winged swallow was described by the French polymath Georges-Louis Leclerc, Comte de Buffon in 1780 in his Histoire Naturelle des Oiseaux from a specimen collected in Cayenne, French Guiana. The bird was also illustrated in a hand-coloured plate engraved by François-Nicolas Martinet in the Planches Enluminées D'Histoire Naturelle which was produced under the supervision of Edme-Louis Daubenton to accompany Buffon's text. Neither the plate caption nor Buffon's description included a scientific name but in 1783 the Dutch naturalist Pieter Boddaert coined the binomial name Hirundo albiventer in his catalogue of the Planches Enluminées. The white-winged swallow is now one of nine species placed in the genus Tachycineta that was introduced in 1850 by the German ornithologist Jean Cabanis. The species is monotypic and no subspecies are currently recognized. The genus name is from the Ancient Greek takhukinētos meaning "moving quickly". The specific epithet albiventer combines the Latin albus meaning "white" and venter meaning "belly".

== Description ==
The adult white-winged swallow is 14 cm (5.5 in) long and weighs 14–17 g (0.49–0.60 oz). It has iridescent blue-green upperparts, white underparts and rump, and white edgings to the secondary flight feathers. The wings are otherwise black, along with the tail. It has dark brown eyes and a black bill and legs. The sexes are similar, although it is noted that the females have slightly less white on the wing. Juveniles have grayer underparts and are duller in general when compared to the adults. The juvenile also has less white on the wing.

White-winged swallows can be distinguished from the similar mangrove swallow by the lack of a white line above its lores and a greater amount of white on its wings.

The call is a harsh chirrup or a repeated, rising, buzz-like zweeed. The alarm call is short and harsh.

== Distribution and habitat ==
The white-winged swallow is native to Argentina, Bolivia, Brazil, Colombia, Ecuador, French Guiana, Guyana, Paraguay, Peru, Suriname, Trinidad and Tobago, and Venezuela. Occasional vagrants reach Panama. They are usually not found on the Pacific coast, especially in the southern portion of South America.

The species is usually found in or near lowland areas along bodies of water such as rivers or lakes, at elevations of about 500 m (1,600 ft).

It is resident in most of its range, although in the most southerly part it is migratory. In Brazil and Argentina, it is only present from approximately mid-September to mid-April. Where this population winters is not well known, but it is most likely in the Guianas, Venezuela, and Colombia.

== Behaviour and ecology ==
=== Breeding ===
The white-winged swallow builds a cup nest lined with other birds' feathers and some seed inside a tree hole, between boulders or in man-made structures. Nests are usually built a few metres above water; pairs nest separately. The clutch is three to six white eggs, measuring 17 mm–20 mm × 13 mm–14.6 mm (0.67 in–0.79 in × 0.51 in–0.57 in) in size and weighing 1.9 g (0.067 oz).

=== Food and feeding ===
The white-winged swallow feeds primarily in flight at a low altitude, catching flying insects. It usually forages over water but may also feed over land. In between foraging attempts, it usually perches on branches near bodies of water. Flight paths are direct and they fly with a flapping flight.

== Conservation ==
The white-winged swallow is classified as Least Concern by the IUCN, based on its very large range, apparently stable population, and large population size.
