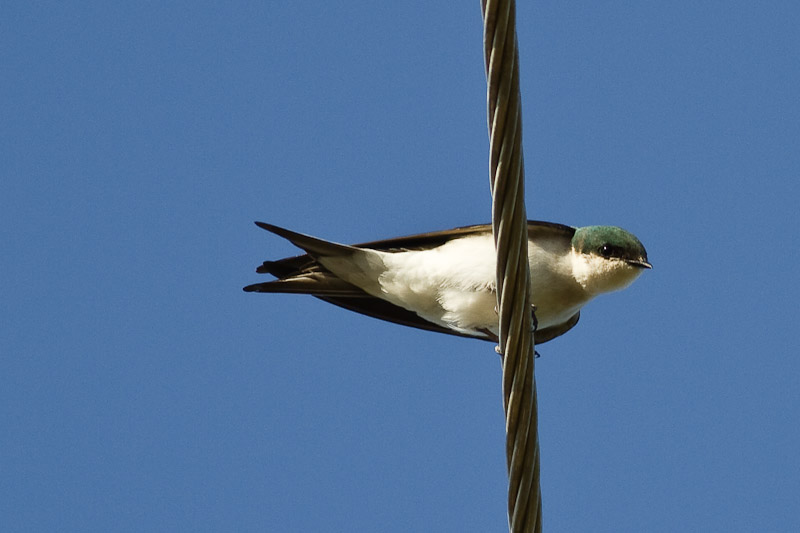

Conservation status
- Endangered (IUCN 3.1)

Scientific classification
- Kingdom: Animalia
- Phylum: Chordata
- Class: Aves
- Order: Passeriformes
- Family: Hirundinidae
- Genus: Tachycineta
- Species: T. cyaneoviridis

Binomial name
- Tachycineta cyaneoviridis (Bryant, 1859)
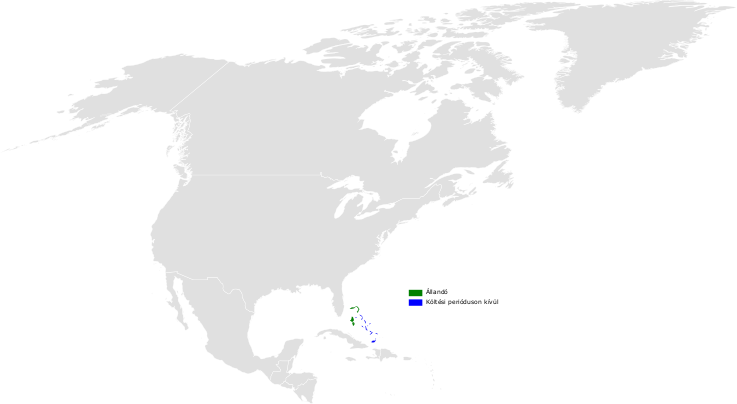

Synonyms
- Callichelidon cyaneoviridis (Bryant, 1859); Callichelidon cyaneoviridis subsp. cyaneoviridis; Hirundo cyaneoviridis Bryant, 1859

= Bahama swallow =

Species of bird

The Bahama swallow (Tachycineta cyaneoviridis) is an endangered swallow endemic to The Bahamas.

== Description ==
This glossy Tachycineta swallow has a green head and back, blue upper wings, a black tail and wingtips, and a white belly and chin.

== Distribution and habitat ==
This swallow breeds only in pineyards on four islands in the northern Bahamas: Andros, Grand Bahama, Abaco, and New Providence. The breeding population on New Providence is, at the very least, greatly reduced from historical levels, and may be extirpated as a breeding species.

The Bahama swallow winters throughout the eastern Bahamas and the Turks and Caicos Islands. It is a rare vagrant elsewhere during migration, including south Florida, the Florida Keys and Cuba. It is also an occasional vagrant to South America.

T. cyaneoviridis is endemic to the Bahamian pineyards, though they are somewhat capable of adapting to urban habitat. Although they do not breed in marshland and fields, they need such habitat to forage; like all swallows, they feed on flying insects.

== Reproduction ==
Bahama swallows nest in old West Indian woodpecker (Melanerpes superciliaris) holes in Caribbean pine (Pinus caribaea var. bahamensis), using pine needles, twigs of trees from the genus Casuarina (introduced species in the Bahamas), and grass to make the nest, and they line it with feathers from other passerines. They typically lay three eggs. Incubation is 15 days and the fledging period is roughly 22 days.
