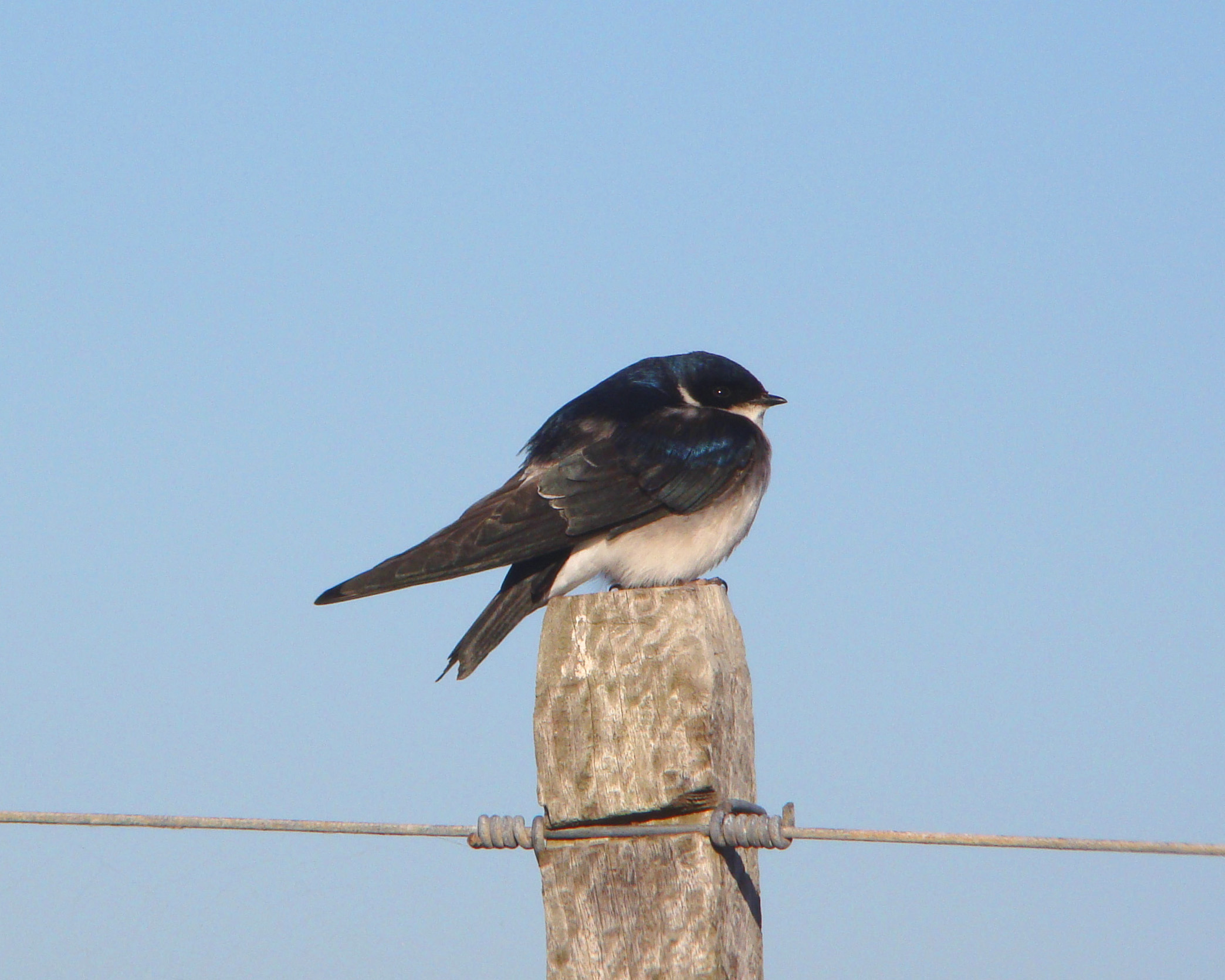

Conservation status
- Least Concern (IUCN 3.1)

Scientific classification
- Kingdom: Animalia
- Phylum: Chordata
- Class: Aves
- Order: Passeriformes
- Family: Hirundinidae
- Genus: Tachycineta
- Species: T. leucopyga

Binomial name
- Tachycineta leucopyga (Meyen, 1834)

Synonyms
- Tachycineta meyeni

= Chilean swallow =

Species of bird

The Chilean swallow (Tachycineta leucopyga) is a species of bird in the family Hirundinidae. It breeds in Chile and Patagonia, migrating north as far as Bolivia, Paraguay, and Rio Grande do Sul.

== Taxonomy and etymology ==
The new genus Tachycineta was created for this group of swallows by German ornithologist Jean Cabanis in 1850. The current genus name Tachycineta, is from Ancient Greek takhukinetos, "moving quickly", and the specific meyeni commemorates Prussian botanist and collector Franz Meyen. Some consider the species name to be leucopyga, which is what the species name originally was. This species, along with the white-rumped swallow, T. leucorrhoa, form a superspecies. This species is monotypic.

== Description ==
The Chilean swallow is about 13 centimetres (5.1 in) in length and weighs 15–20 grams (0.53–0.71 oz). It is glossy blue-black above and white below with a white rump. Its wings and tail are black, with white tips on its inner secondaries and its tertials. Their underwing coverts and auxiliaries are both grey. The Chilean swallow's bill and legs are black. The sexes are alike, and the juveniles are duller and browner.

It is similar to the white-rumped swallow, but lacks the white forehead of that species and has bluer upperparts and grey underwing-coverts. In addition to this, the breeding ranges of the two have almost no overlap.

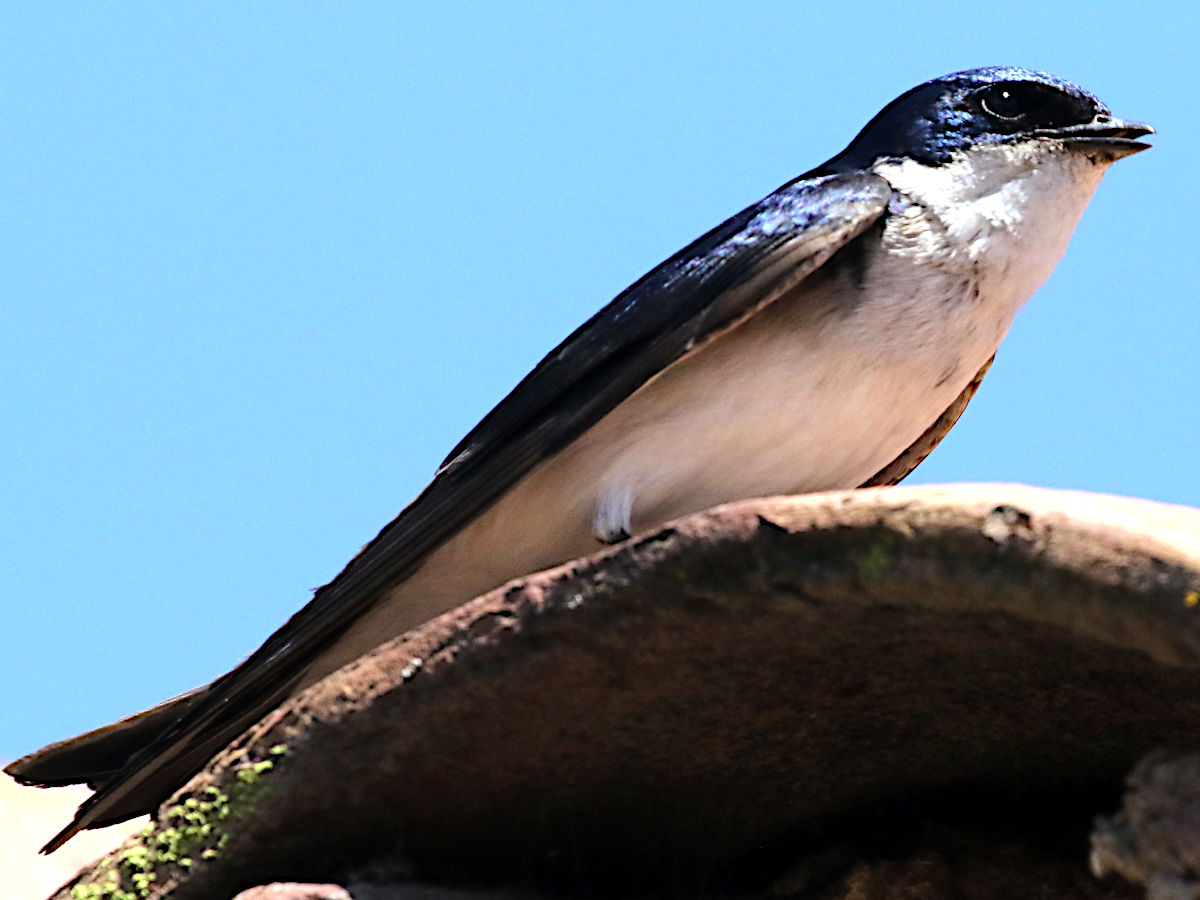
White belly, Chile

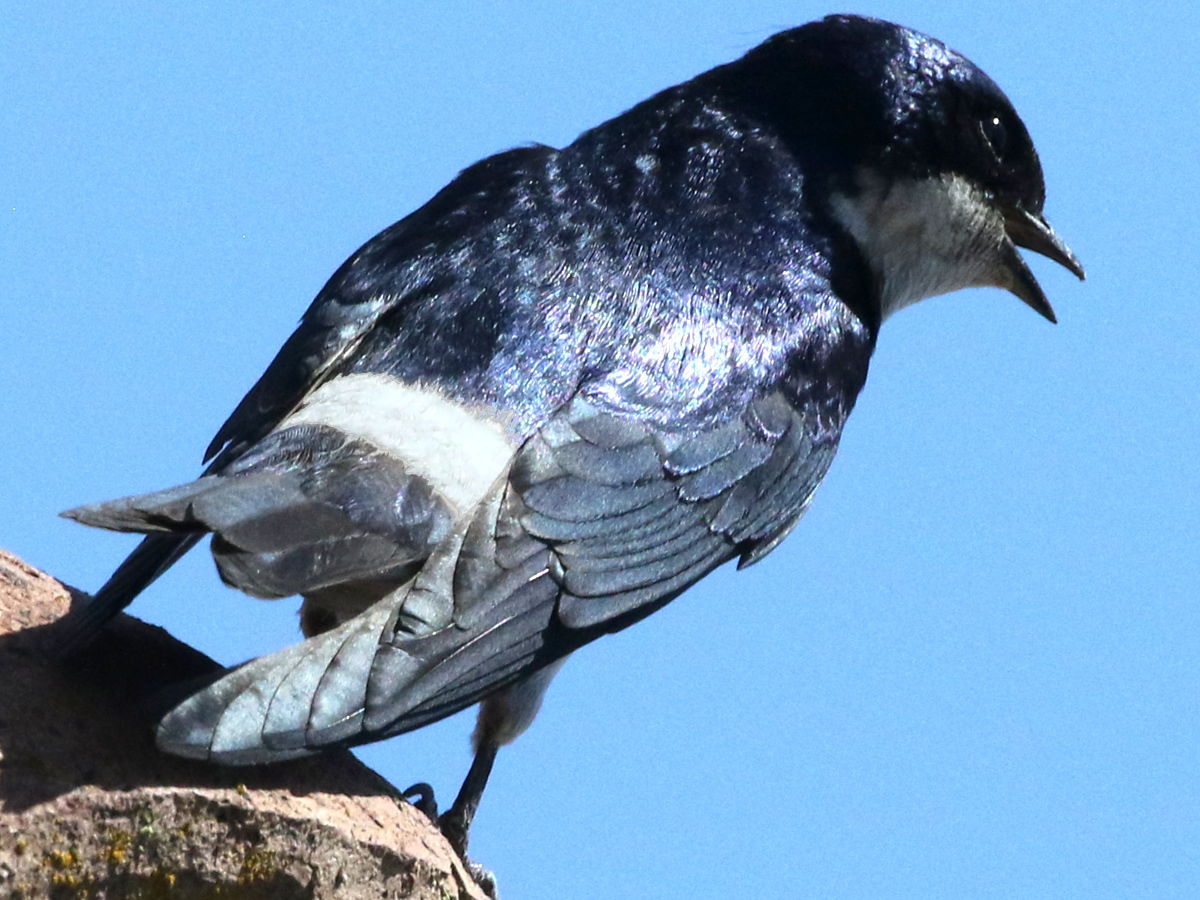
White rump patch, Chile

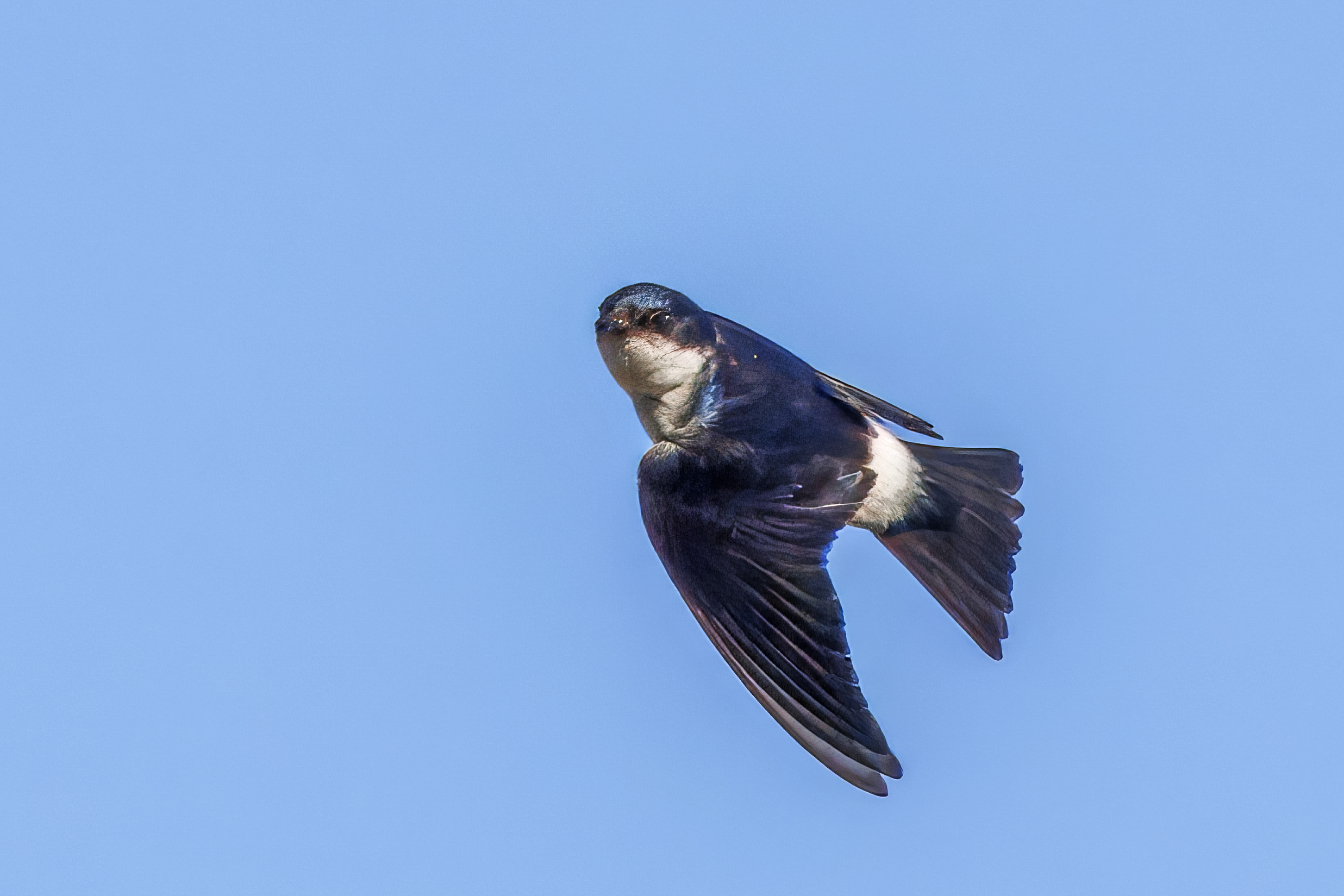
flying in Chile

== Distribution ==
This swallow is native to Argentina, Bolivia, Brazil, Chile, Falkland Islands, Paraguay, and Uruguay. It is vagrant to South Georgia and the South Sandwich Islands. This swallow can also be found in Peru, but its origin is uncertain. Its breeding range is from the Atacama Desert in Chile and most of Argentina to the southern tip of South America. It is a year-round resident to the northern part of its range, but it is known to be migratory in the southern part. It is not well known where this population winters, but it seems to winter in northern Argentina, southern Brazil, Uruguay, and possibly Bolivia.

== Behaviour ==
=== Breeding ===
This species has been seen to nest in both artificial and natural cavities, usually near water. They are usually solitary, although they will occasionally nest in loose groups if nest sites are near each other. Their nests are made from mud or dry grass and are lined with feathers.

This swallow is a seasonal breeder. It usually breeds from September and sometimes early October, especially near the tip of South America, to February. In Chile, it usually raises two to three broods.

The Chilean swallow usually has a clutch of four to six white eggs. The eggs measure 17.8 mm–21 mm × 13 mm–14.3 mm (0.70 in–0.83 in × 0.51 in–0.56 in) and weigh around 2 g (0.071 oz).

After the breeding season, it is found that the Chilean swallow forms flocks.

=== Diet ===
These birds are insectivores, usually feeding on flying insects. They usually forage alone or in small groups. When foraging, their flight paths are low and direct.

== Status ==
The Chilean swallow is evaluated to be least concern by the IUCN. The justification for this is the fact that the species is believed to have a range of about 2,180,000 km^{2} (840,000 mi^{2}), its population is increasing, and the population is not believed to be small enough to be vulnerable under the population size criterion.
