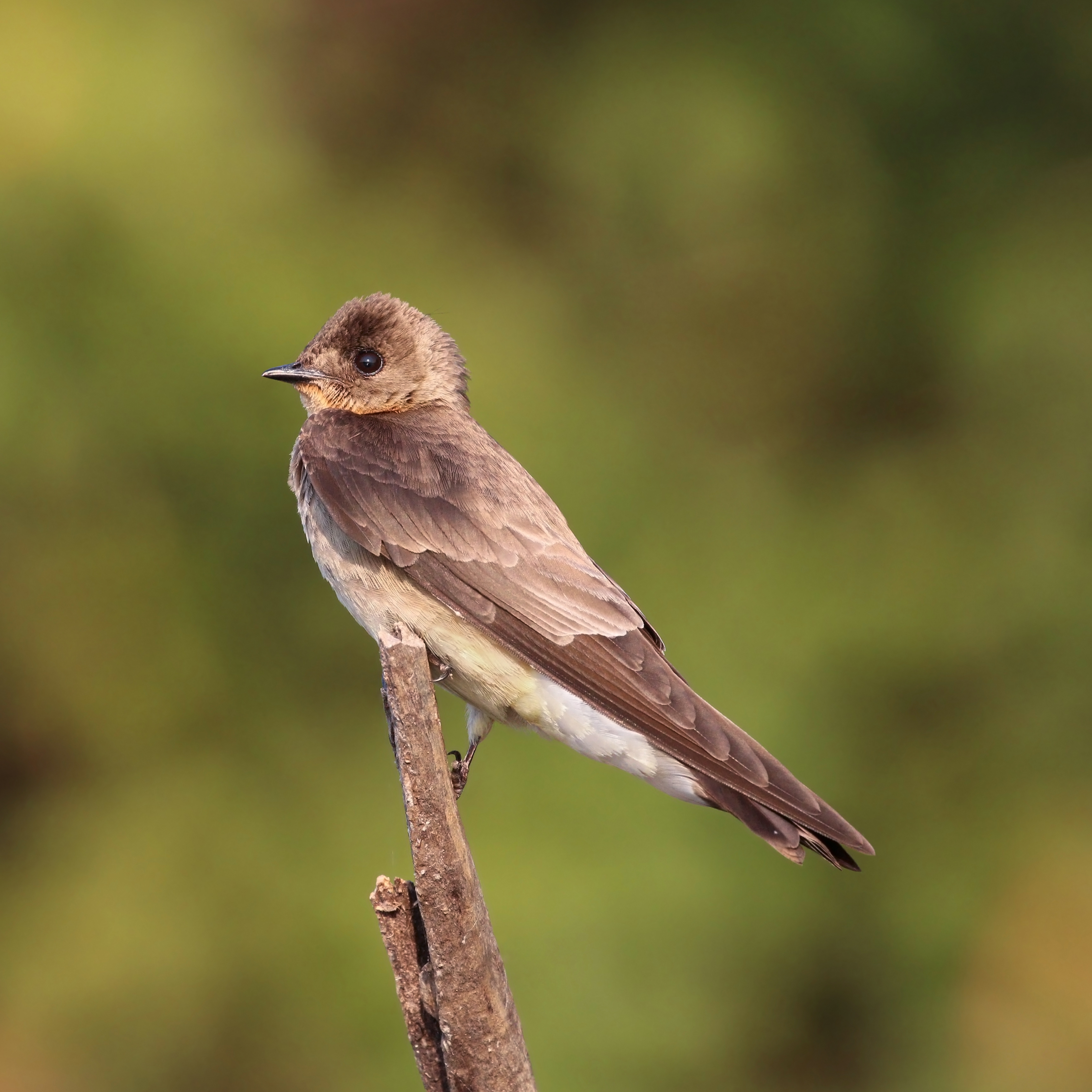
- S. r. ruficollis The Pantanal, Brazil

Conservation status
- Least Concern (IUCN 3.1)

Scientific classification
- Kingdom: Animalia
- Phylum: Chordata
- Class: Aves
- Order: Passeriformes
- Family: Hirundinidae
- Genus: Stelgidopteryx
- Species: S. ruficollis

Binomial name
- Stelgidopteryx ruficollis (Vieillot, 1817)

= Southern rough-winged swallow =

Species of bird

The southern rough-winged swallow (Stelgidopteryx ruficollis) a species of bird in the family Hirundinidae, the swallows and martins. It is found in Central America from Honduras south, in every mainland South American country except Chile, on Trinidad, and as a vagrant to Aruba, Bonaire, Curaçao, Tobago, and the Falkland Islands.

== Taxonomy and systematics ==
The southern rough-winged swallow was originally described in 1817 as Hirundo ruficollis by French ornithologist Louis Vieillot in his Nouveau Dictionnaire d'Histoire Naturelle. It was later reassigned to its present genus Stelgidopteryx which was erected in 1858. For much of the twentieth century it and what is now the northern rough-winged swallow (S. serripennis) were treated as conspecific. They are the only members of the genus and form a superspecies.

The southern rough-winged swallow has these four subspecies:

- S. r. uropygialis (Lawrence, 1863)
- S. r. decolor Griscom, 1929
- S. r. aequalis Bangs, 1901
- S. r. ruficollis (Vieillot, 1817)

== Description ==
The southern rough-winged swallow is about 13 cm (5.1 in) long and weighs 14 to 18 g (0.49 to 0.63 oz). The sexes have almost the same plumage. Adult males of the nominate subspecies S. r. ruficollis have a mostly dark gray-brown head with a cinnamon throat. Their upperparts are mostly dark gray-brown with a slightly paler rump. Their tail is square; it and their wings are blackish brown. Their wings' outer primaries have stiff recurved barbs on their outer webs that give the bird its English name. Females lack these barbs. Both sexes have a dark gray-brown breast, a yellowish gray-brown belly, and white undertail coverts. Juveniles have a duller throat than adults and pale edges on the feathers of their back. Subspecies S. r. decolor is paler overall than the other subspecies and has thin dark streaks on its underparts. S. r. uropygialis has a whitish rump. S. r. aequalis has light brown upperparts with a paler rump and a tawny-buff throat.

== Distribution and habitat ==
The subspecies of the southern rough-winged swallow are found thus:

- S. r. uropygialis: from eastern Honduras south through eastern Nicaragua, northern and eastern Costa Rica, much of Panama, western Colombia, and western Ecuador into extreme northwestern Peru
- S. r. decolor: western Costa Rica and western Panama
- S. r. aequalis: northern Colombia, western Venezuela, and Trinidad
- S. r. ruficollis: from southeastern Colombia south through eastern Ecuador, eastern Peru, and eastern Bolivia into northern and northeastern Argentina as far as Buenos Aires Province; from there east across southern and eastern Venezuela, the Guianas, and all of Brazil, Paraguay, and Uruguay

The species has been documented as a vagrant on the Caribbean islands of Aruba, Bonaire, Curaçao, and Tobago that are arrayed along the north coast of South America, and also far to the southeast on the Falkland Islands.

The southern rough-winged swallow inhabits a variety of open landscapes, especially those that have water features. It also occurs in clearings within forest. Overall it mostly is found up to about 1,000 m (3,300 ft) above sea level but there are records as high as 3,600 m (11,800 ft). It reaches 1,200 m (3,900 ft) in Honduras, 1,800 m (5,900 ft) in Costa Rica, 2,200 m (7,200 ft) in Colombia, 1,500 m (4,900 ft) in Ecuador and Peru, and 1,600 m (5,200 ft) in Venezuela. In Brazil it mostly occurs below 1,000 m (3,300 ft) and "occasionally much higher".

== Behavior ==
=== Movement ===
The southern rough-winged swallow is a partial migrant. During the austral winter it vacates southern South America to north of a line roughly from northern Argentina east to the Atlantic in Brazil's São Paulo state. North of that line the species is a year-round resident, some of whose populations are increased by migrants from the south. The details of where the migrants winter are lacking but some individuals have traveled as far north as Colombia and Suriname. It forms large flocks in the non-breeding season.

=== Feeding ===
The southern rough-winged swallow feeds on insects captured in mid-air; its diet is not known in detail but includes flies (Diptera), beetles (Coleoptera), true bugs (Heteroptera), and Hymenoptera such as flying ants. It typically forages in small flocks with slow flight low to the ground or somewhat higher, and over both land and water.

=== Breeding ===
The southern rough-winged swallow's breeding season has not been fully defined but spans from March to June in Central America and on Trinidad and from February to July in Colombia. It breeds singly or in small colonies, nesting in cavities in earthen banks. Though it usually takes an abandoned burrow made by another species such as a motmot (Momotidae) or jacamar (Galbulidae), it has been observed digging its own. Within the burrow it builds a nest of dry grass, leaves, and feathers. Its clutch size varies geographically, being four to six eggs in Central America, three to six on Trinidad, and three to five in the southern part of its range. The female alone incubates, for a period of 15 to 18 days. Fledging occurs 18 to 21 days after hatch and both parents provision the nestlings.

=== Vocalization ===
The southern rough-winged swallow's most common vocalization has variously been described as "an upslurred suree", "a musical, rising zwee", and "a distinctive rough, upslurred djreeet". It also makes twitters and other buzzy vocalizations.

== Status ==
The IUCN has assessed the southern rough-winged swallow as being of Least Concern. It has an extremely large range; its estimated population of at least fifty million mature individuals is believed to be stable. No immediate threats have been identified. It is considered fairly common in Honduras and Costa Rica, common in Colombia, "widespread" in Ecuador, "fairly common and widespread" in eastern Peru and local in the northwest, "widespread and common" in Venezuela, and "common to frequent" in Brazil. However, it is "[r]estricted to areas with natural nest-sites, as it does not often use artificial ones".
