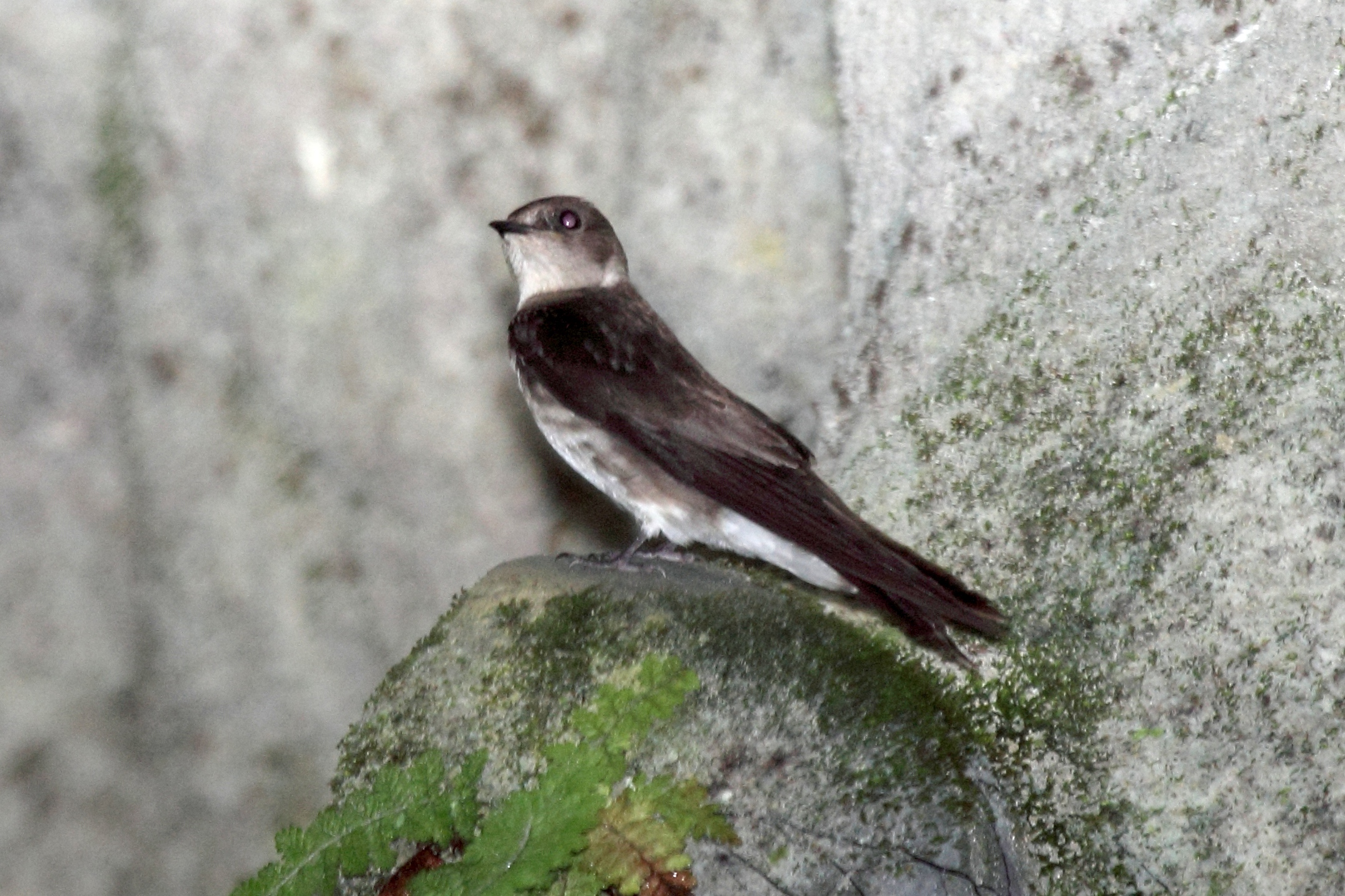

Conservation status
- Least Concern (IUCN 3.1)

Scientific classification
- Kingdom: Animalia
- Phylum: Chordata
- Class: Aves
- Order: Passeriformes
- Family: Hirundinidae
- Genus: Stelgidopteryx
- Species: S. serripennis
- Subspecies: S. s. ridgwayi

Trinomial name
- Stelgidopteryx serripennis ridgwayi Nelson, 1901

Synonyms
- Stelgidopteryx ridgwayi

= Ridgway's rough-winged swallow =

Subspecies of bird

Ridgway's rough-winged swallow (Stelgidopteryx serripennis ridgwayi) is a bird in the family Hirundinidae. It is found in Belize, Guatemala, and Mexico. Most taxonomic authorities consider it to be a subspecies of the northern rough-winged swallow.

Its common name and Latin binomial commemorate American ornithologist Robert Ridgway.
