= Flight feather =

Bird feather that generates lift and thrust

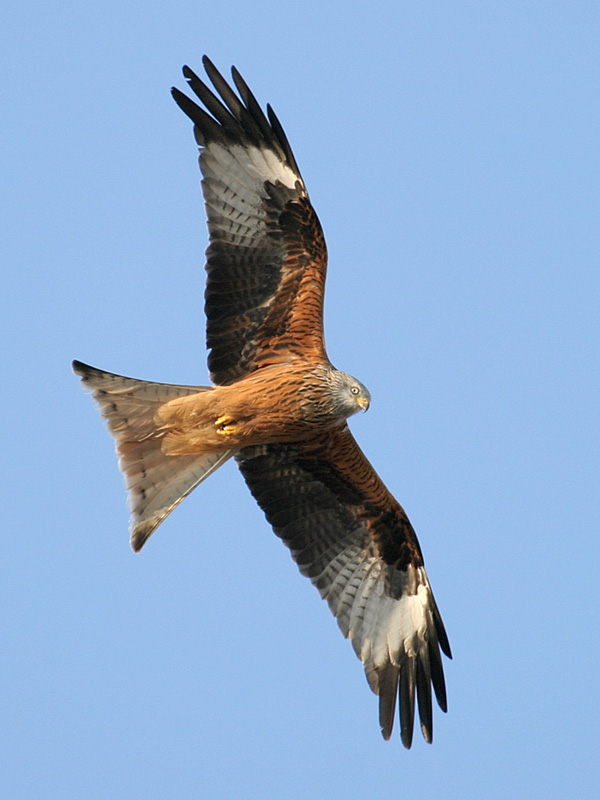
Red kite (Milvus milvus) in flight, showing remiges and rectrices

Flight feathers (Pennae volatus) are the long, stiff, asymmetrically shaped, but symmetrically paired pennaceous feathers on the wings or tail of a bird; those on the wings are called remiges (/ˈrɛmɪdʒiːz/), singular remex (/ˈriːmɛks/), while those on the tail are called rectrices (/ˈrɛktrɪsiːz/ or /rɛkˈtraɪsiːz/), singular rectrix (/ˈrɛktrɪks/). The primary function of the flight feathers is to aid in the generation of both thrust and lift, thereby enabling flight. The flight feathers of some birds perform additional functions, generally associated with territorial displays, courtship rituals or feeding methods. In some species, these feathers have developed into long showy plumes used in visual courtship displays, while in others they create a sound during display flights. Tiny serrations on the leading edge of their remiges help owls to fly silently (and therefore hunt more successfully), while the extra-stiff rectrices of woodpeckers help them to brace against tree trunks as they hammer on them. Even flightless birds still retain flight feathers, though sometimes in radically modified forms.

The remiges are divided into primary and secondary feathers based on their position along the wing. There are typically 11 primaries attached to the manus (six attached to the metacarpus and five to the phalanges), but the outermost primary, called the remicle, is often rudimentary or absent; certain birds, notably the flamingos, grebes, and storks, have seven primaries attached to the metacarpus and 12 in all. Secondary feathers are attached to the ulna. The fifth secondary remex (numbered inwards from the carpal joint) was formerly thought to be absent in some species, but the modern view of this diastataxy is that there is a gap between the fourth and fifth secondaries. Tertiary feathers growing upon the adjoining portion of the brachium are not considered true remiges.

The moult of their flight feathers can cause serious problems for birds, as it can impair their ability to fly. Different species have evolved different strategies for coping with this, ranging from dropping all their flight feathers at once (and thus becoming flightless for some relatively short period of time) to extending the moult over a period of several years.

== Remiges ==
Bird wing bone structure, indicating attachment points of remiges

Remiges (from the Latin for "oarsman") are located on the posterior side of the wing. Ligaments attach the long calami (quills) firmly to the wing bones, and a thick, strong band of tendinous tissue known as the postpatagium helps to hold and support the remiges in place. Corresponding remiges on individual birds are symmetrical between the two wings, matching to a large extent in size and shape (except in the case of mutation or damage), though not necessarily in the pattern. They are given different names depending on their position along the wing.

=== Primaries ===
Primaries are connected to the manus (the bird's "hand", composed of carpometacarpus and phalanges); these are the longest and narrowest of the remiges (particularly those attached to the phalanges), and they can be individually rotated. These feathers are especially important for flapping flight, as they are the principal source of thrust, moving the bird forward through the air. The mechanical properties of primaries are important in supporting flight. Most thrust is generated on the downstroke of flapping flight. However, on the upstroke (when the bird often draws its wing in close to its body), the primaries are separated and rotated, reducing air resistance while still helping to provide some thrust. The flexibility of the remiges on the wingtips of large soaring birds also allows for the spreading of those feathers, which helps to reduce the creation of wingtip vortices, thereby reducing drag. The barbules on these feathers, friction barbules, are specialized with large lobular barbicels that help grip and prevent slippage of overlying feathers and are present in most of the flying birds.

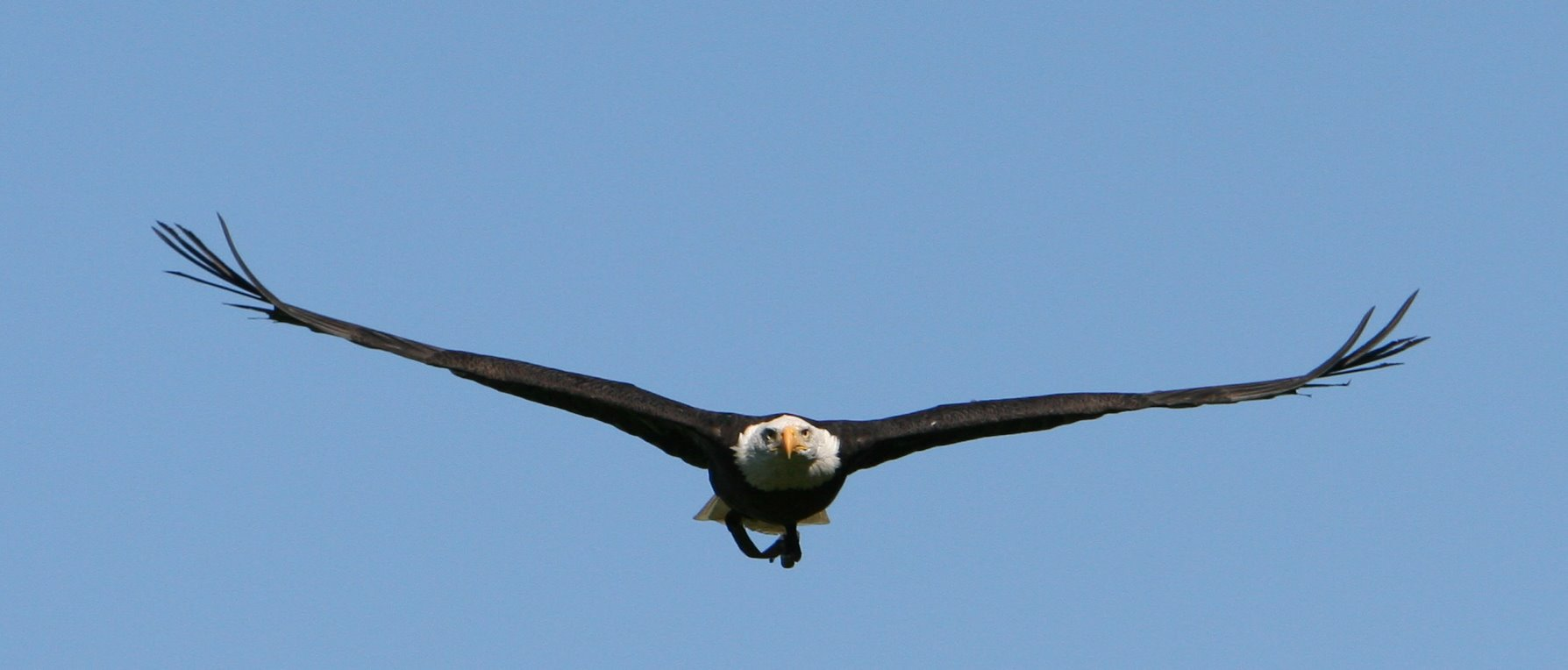
Bald eagle (Haliaeetus leucocephalus) in flight with primaries spread to decrease drag and improve lift

Species vary somewhat in the number of primaries they possess. The number in non-passerines generally varies between nine and eleven, but grebes, storks and flamingos have twelve, and ostriches have sixteen. While most modern passerines have ten primaries, some have only nine. Those with nine are missing the most distal primary (sometimes called the remicle) which is typically very small and sometimes rudimentary in passerines.

The outermost primaries—those connected to the phalanges—are sometimes known as pinions.

=== Secondaries ===
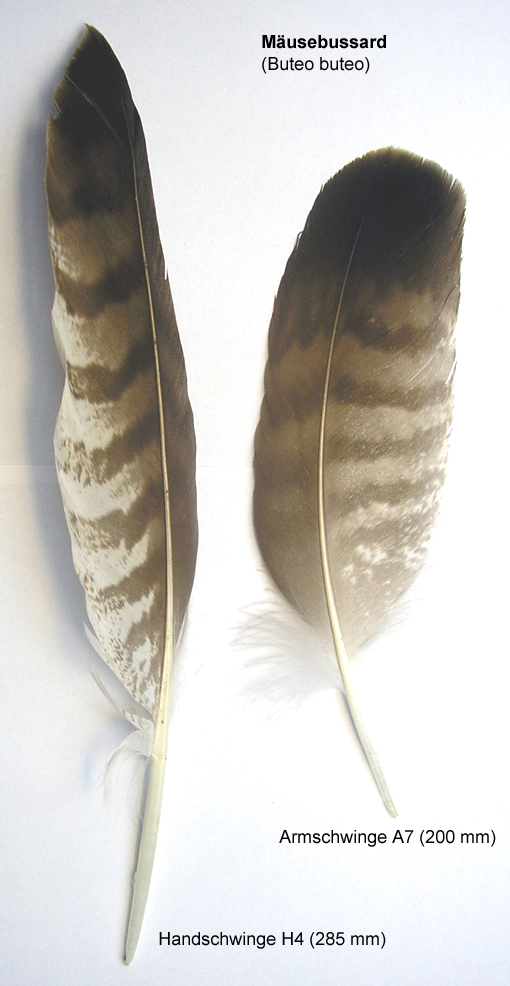
Primary (left) and secondary (right) feathers of the common buzzard (Buteo buteo); note the asymmetrical orientation of the shafts

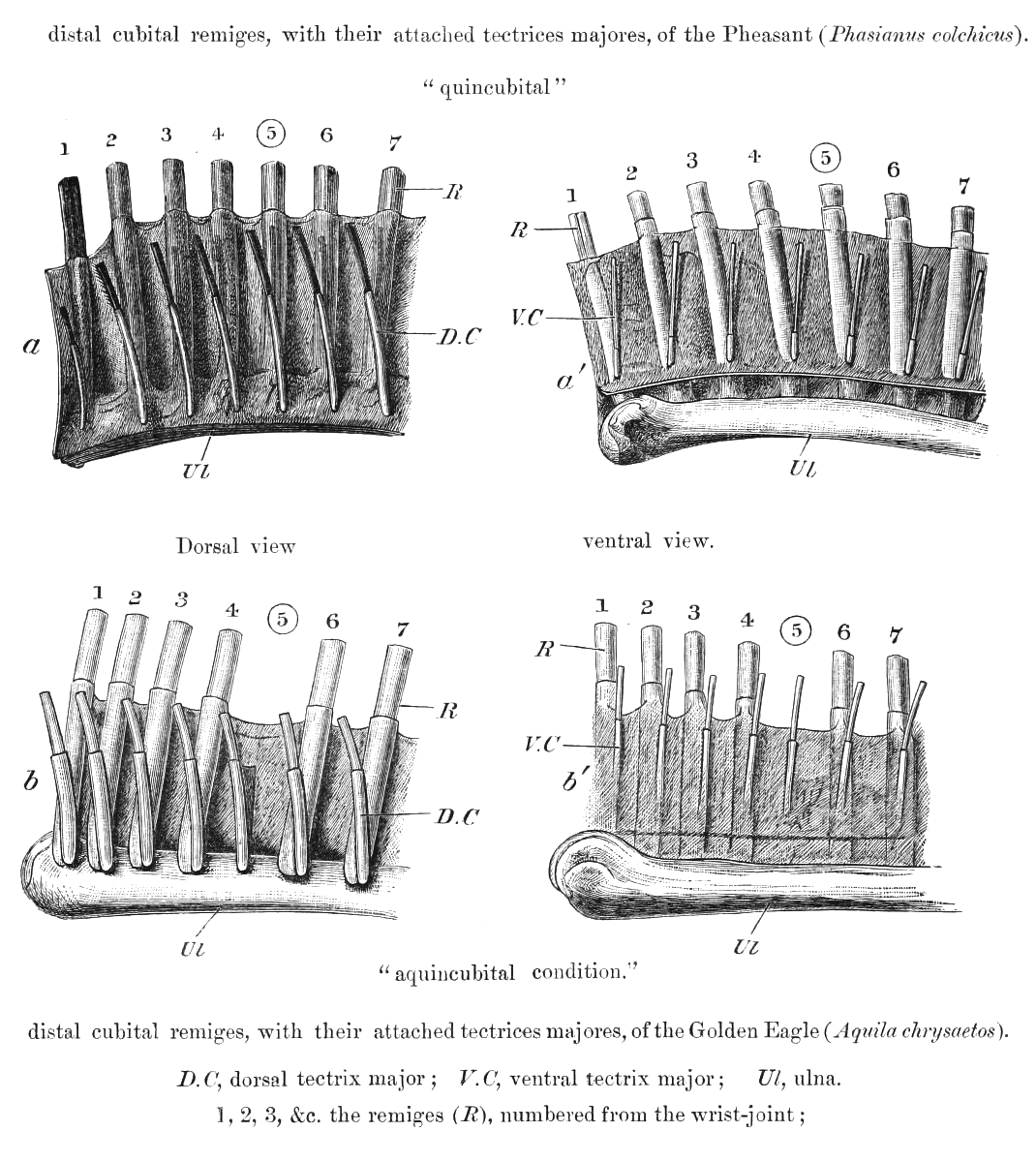
Secondaries of a pheasant showing eutaxis (above) and an eagle showing diastataxis (below)

Secondaries are connected to the ulna. In some species, the ligaments that bind these remiges to the bone connect to small, rounded projections, known as quill knobs, on the ulna; in other species, no such knobs exist. Secondary feathers remain close together in flight (they cannot be individually separated like the primaries can) and help to provide lift by creating the airfoil shape of the bird's wing. Secondaries tend to be shorter and broader than primaries, with blunter ends (see illustration). They vary in number from six in hummingbirds to as many as 40 in some species of albatross. In general, larger and longer-winged species have a larger number of secondaries. Birds in more than 40 non-passerine families seem to be missing the fifth secondary feather on each wing, a state known as diastataxis (those that do have the fifth secondary are said to be eutaxic). In these birds, the fifth set of secondary covert feathers does not cover any remiges, possibly due to a twisting of the feather papillae during embryonic development. Loons, grebes, pelicans, hawks and eagles, cranes, sandpipers, gulls, parrots, and owls are among the families missing this feather.

=== Tertials ===
Tertials arise in the brachial region and are not considered true remiges as they are not supported by attachment to the corresponding bone, in this case the humerus. These elongated "true" tertials act as a protective cover for all or part of the folded primaries and secondaries, and do not qualify as flight feathers as such. However, many authorities use the term tertials to refer to the shorter, more symmetrical innermost secondaries of passerines (arising from the olecranon and performing the same function as true tertials) in an effort to distinguish them from other secondaries. The term humeral is sometimes used for birds such as the albatrosses and pelicans that have a long humerus.

=== Tectrices ===
The calami of the flight feathers are protected by a layer of non-flight feathers called covert feathers or tectrices (singular tectrix), at least one layer of them both above and beneath the flight feathers of the wings as well as above and below the rectrices of the tail. These feathers may vary widely in size – in fact, the upper tail tectrices of the male peafowl, rather than its rectrices, are what constitute its elaborate and colorful "train".

=== Emargination ===
The outermost primaries of large soaring birds, particularly raptors, often show a pronounced narrowing at some variable distance along the feather edges. These narrowings are called either notches or emarginations depending on the degree of their slope. An emargination is a gradual change, and can be found on either side of the feather. A notch is an abrupt change, and is only found on the wider trailing edge of the remex. (Both are visible on the primary in the photo showing the feathers; they can be found about halfway along both sides of the left hand feather—a shallow notch on the left, and a gradual emargination on the right.) The presence of notches and emarginations creates gaps at the wingtip; air is forced through these gaps, increasing the generation of lift.

=== Alula ===
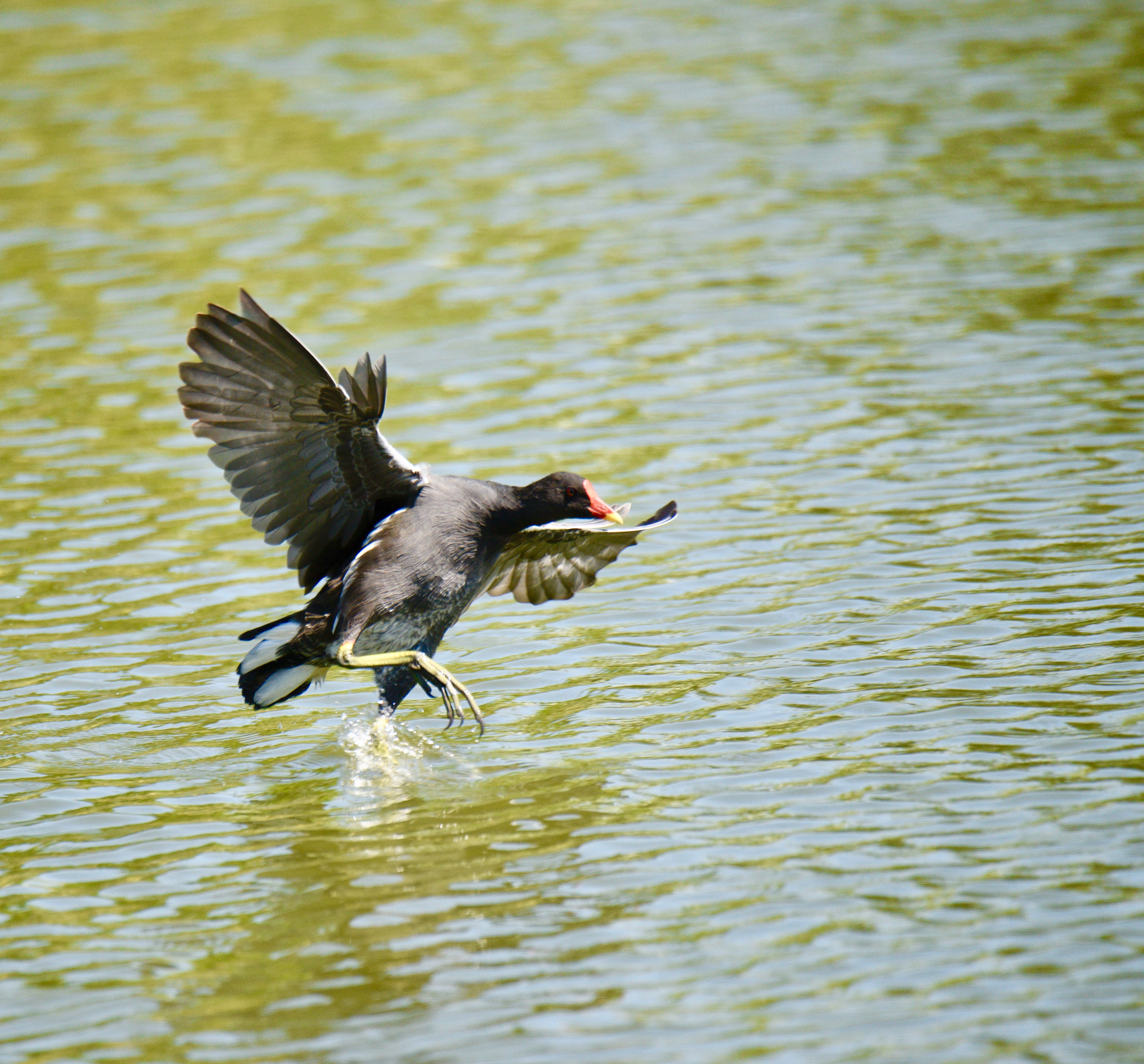
Common moorhen landing, showing outspread alulae on the wings' leading edge

Feathers on the alula or bastard wing are not generally considered to be flight feathers in the strict sense; though they are asymmetrical, they lack the length and stiffness of most true flight feathers. However, alula feathers are definitely an aid to slow flight. These feathers—which are attached to the bird's "thumb" and normally lie flush against the anterior edge of the wing—function in the same way as the slats on an airplane wing, allowing the wing to achieve a higher than normal angle of attack – and thus lift – without resulting in a stall. By manipulating its thumb to create a gap between the alula and the rest of the wing, a bird can avoid stalling when flying at low speeds or landing.

=== Delayed development in hoatzins ===
The development of the remiges (and alulae) of nestling hoatzins is much delayed compared to the development of these feathers in other young birds, presumably because young hoatzins are equipped with claws on their first two digits. They use these small rounded hooks to grasp branches when clambering about in trees, and feathering on these digits would presumably interfere with that functionality. Most youngsters shed their claws sometime between their 70th and 100th day of life, but some retain them— though callused-over and unusable— into adulthood.

== Rectrices ==
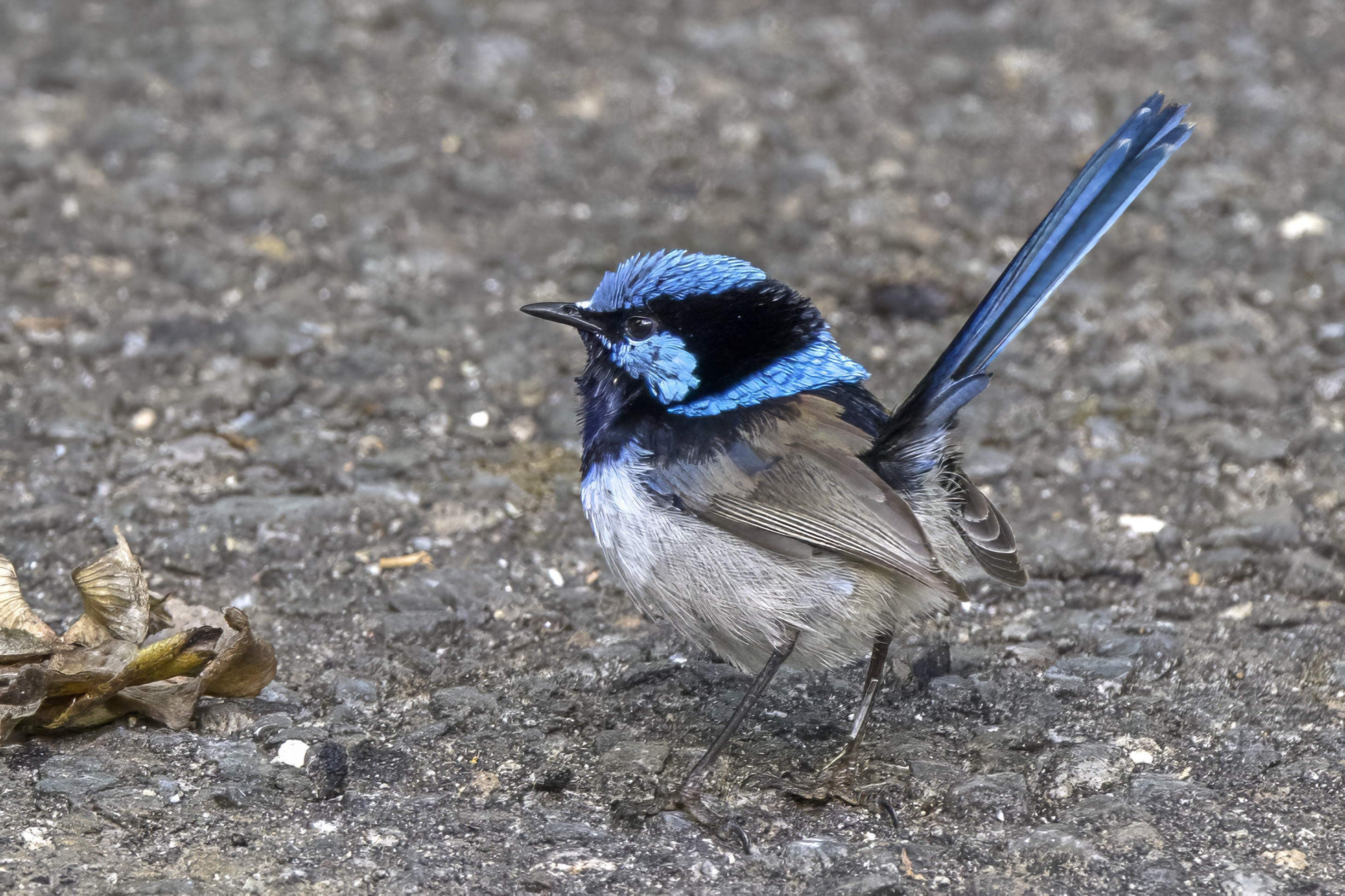
A superb fairywren.

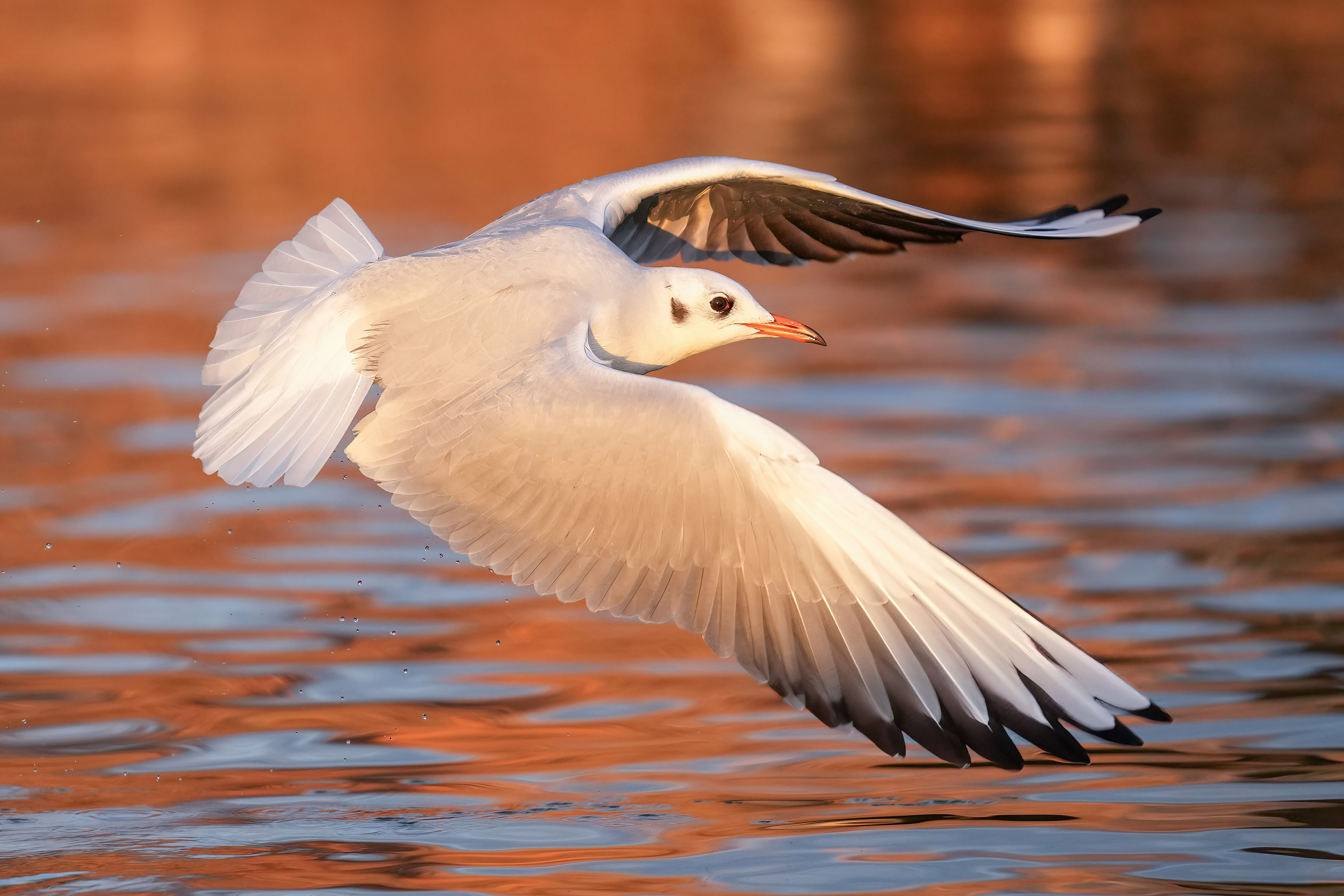
A black-headed gull in flight, with its rectrices near its rump.

Rectrices (singular rectrix) from the Latin word for "helmsman", help the bird to brake and steer in flight. These feathers lie in a single horizontal row on the rear margin of the anatomic tail. Only the central pair are attached (via ligaments) to the tail bones; the remaining rectrices are embedded into the rectricial bulbs, complex structures of fat and muscle that surround those bones. Rectrices are always paired, with a vast majority of species having six pairs. They are absent in grebes and some ratites, and greatly reduced in size in penguins. Many grouse species have more than 12 rectrices. In some species (including ruffed grouse, hazel grouse and common snipe), the number varies among individuals. Domestic pigeons have a highly variable number as a result of changes brought about over centuries of selective breeding.

== Numbering conventions ==
In order to make the discussion of such topics as moult processes or body structure easier, ornithologists assign a number to each flight feather. By convention, the numbers assigned to primary feathers always start with the letter P (P1, P2, P3, etc.), those of secondaries with the letter S, those of tertials with T and those of rectrices with R.

Most authorities number the primaries descendantly, starting from the innermost primary (the one closest to the secondaries) and working outwards; others number them ascendantly, from the most distal primary inwards. There are some advantages to each method. Descendant numbering follows the normal sequence of most birds' primary moult. In the event that a species is missing the small distal tenth primary, as some passerines are, its lack does not impact the numbering of the remaining primaries. Ascendant numbering, on the other hand, allows for uniformity in the numbering of non-passerine primaries, as they almost invariably have four attached to the manus regardless of how many primaries they have overall. This method is particularly useful for indicating wing formulae, as the outermost primary is the one with which the measurements begin.

Secondaries are always numbered ascendantly, starting with the outermost secondary (the one closest to the primaries) and working inwards. Tertials are also numbered ascendantly, but in this case, the numbers continue on consecutively from that given to the last secondary (e.g. ... S5, S6, T7, T8, ... etc.).

Rectrices are always numbered from the centermost pair outwards in both directions.

== Specialized flight feathers ==
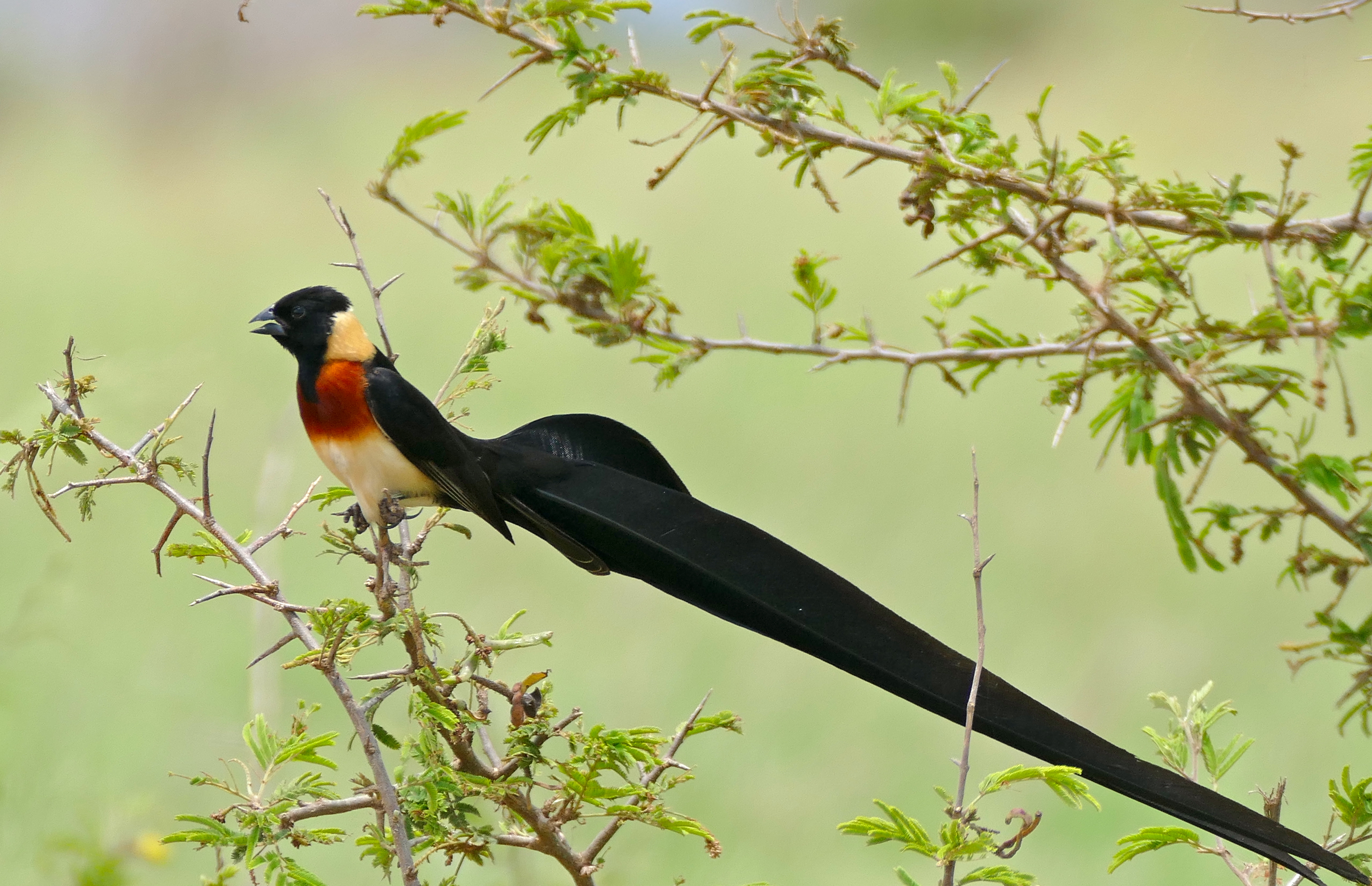
Male long-tailed paradise whydah (Vidua paradisaea) showing modified rectrices

The flight feathers of some species provide additional functionality. In some species, for example, either remiges or rectrices make a sound during flight. These sounds are most often associated with courtship or territorial displays. The outer primaries of male broad-tailed hummingbirds produce a distinctive high-pitched trill, both in direct flight and in power-dives during courtship displays; this trill is diminished when the outer primaries are worn, and absent when those feathers have been moulted. During the northern lapwing's zigzagging display flight, the bird's outer primaries produce a humming sound. The outer primaries of the male American woodcock are shorter and slightly narrower than those of the female, and are likely the source of the whistling and twittering sounds made during his courtship display flights. Male club-winged manakins use modified secondaries to make a clear trilling courtship call. A curve-tipped secondary on each wing is dragged against an adjacent ridged secondary at high speeds (as many as 110 times per second—slightly faster than a hummingbird's wingbeat) to create a stridulation much like that produced by some insects. Both Wilson's and common snipe have modified outer tail feathers which make noise when they are spread during the birds' roller coaster display flights; as the bird dives, wind flows through the modified feathers and creates a series of rising and falling notes, which is known as "winnowing". Differences between the sounds produced by these two former conspecific subspecies—and the fact that the outer two pairs of rectrices in Wilson's snipe are modified, while only the single outermost pair are modified in common snipe—were among the characteristics used to justify their splitting into two distinct and separate species.

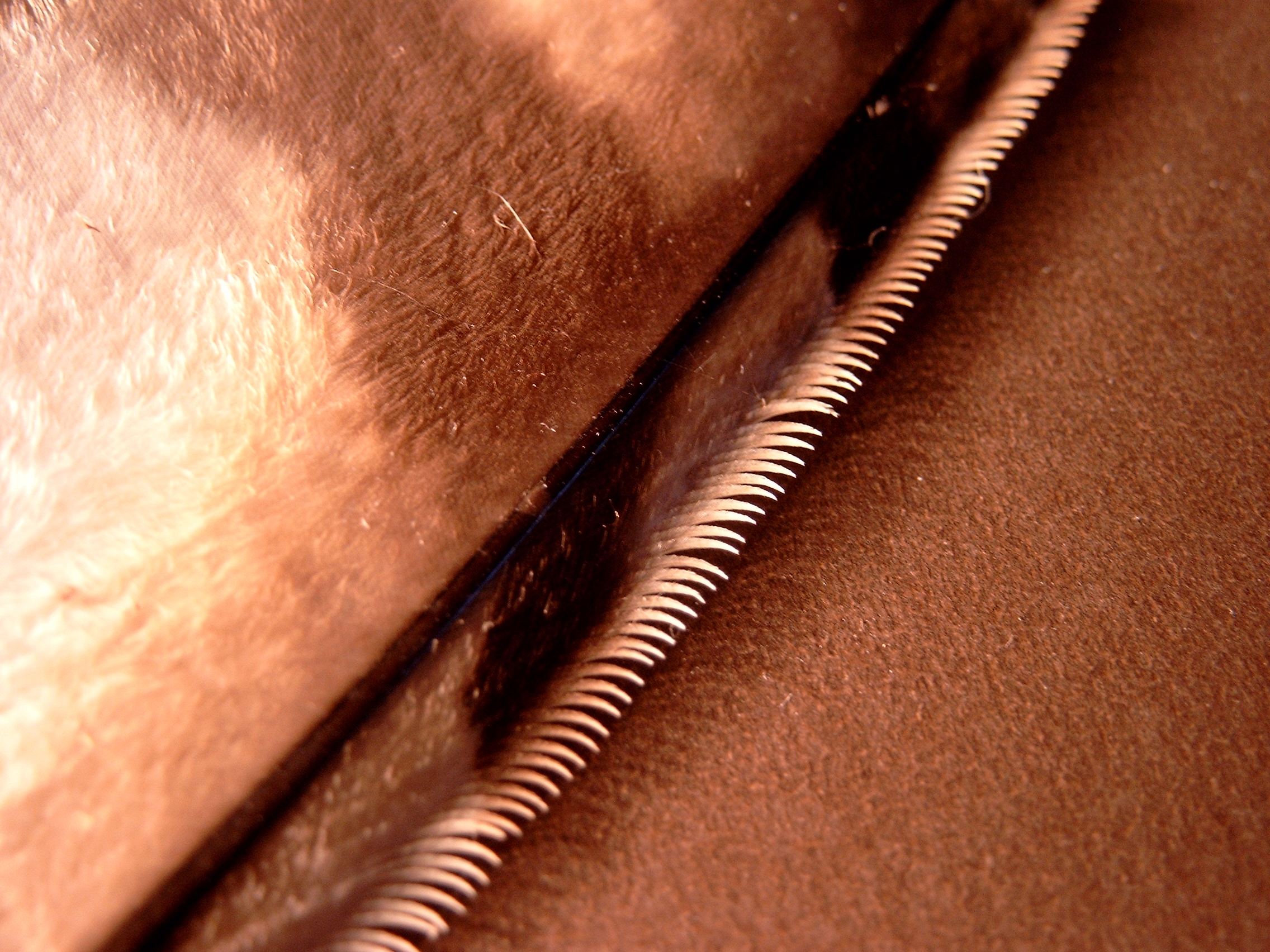
Leading edge of an owl feather, showing serrations

Flight feathers are also used by some species in visual displays. Male standard-winged and pennant-winged nightjars have modified P2 primaries (using the descendant numbering scheme explained above) which are displayed during their courtship rituals. In the standard-winged nightjar, this modified primary consists of an extremely long shaft with a small "pennant" (actually a large web of barbules) at the tip. In the pennant-winged nightjar, the P2 primary is an extremely long (but otherwise normal) feather, while P3, P4 and P5 are successively shorter; the overall effect is a broadly forked wingtip with a very long plume beyond the lower half of the fork.

Males of many species, ranging from the widely introduced ring-necked pheasant to Africa's many whydahs, have one or more elongated pairs of rectrices, which play a required role in their courtship rituals. The outermost pair of rectrices in male lyrebirds are long and strongly curved at the ends. These plumes are raised up over the bird's head (along with modified uppertail coverts) during his display. Rectrix modification reaches its pinnacle among the birds of paradise, which display an assortment of often bizarrely modified feathers, ranging from the extremely long plumes of the ribbon-tailed astrapia (nearly three times the length of the bird itself) to the dramatically coiled twin plumes of the magnificent bird-of-paradise.

Owls have remiges which are serrated rather than smooth on the leading edge. This adaptation disrupts the flow of air over the wings, eliminating the noise that airflow over a smooth surface normally creates, and allowing the birds to fly and hunt silently.

The rectrices of woodpeckers are proportionately short and very stiff, allowing them to better brace themselves against tree trunks while feeding. This adaptation is also found, though to a lesser extent, in some other species that feed along tree trunks, including treecreepers and woodcreepers.

Scientists have not yet determined the function of all flight feather modifications. Male swallows in the genera Psalidoprocne and Stelgidopteryx have tiny recurved hooks on the leading edges of their outer primaries, but the function of these hooks is not yet known; some authorities suggest they may produce a sound during territorial or courtship displays.

== Vestigiality in flightless birds ==
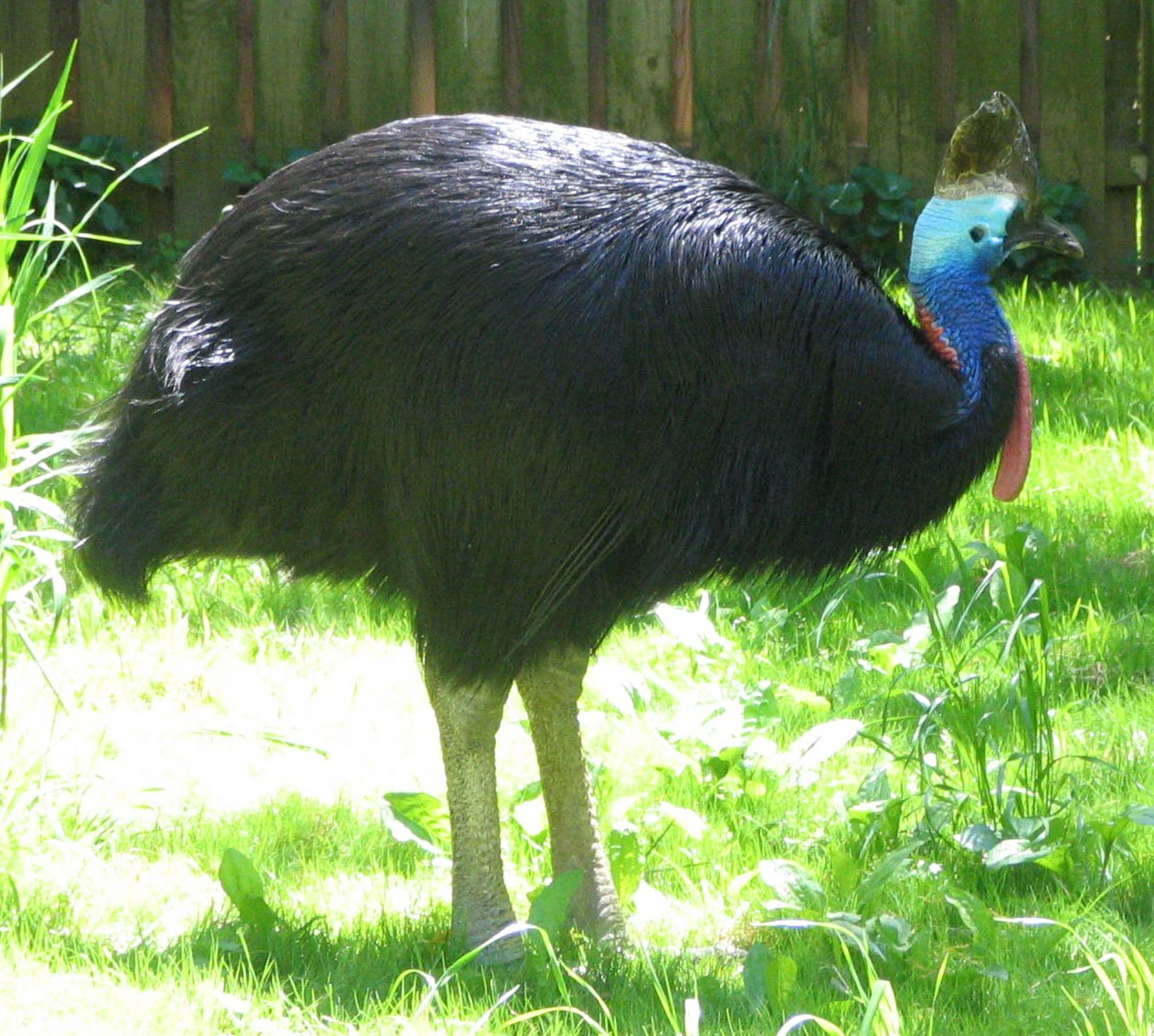
Double-wattled cassowary, (Casuarius casuarius) showing modified remiges

Over time, a small number of bird species have lost their ability to fly. Some of these, such as the steamer ducks, show no appreciable changes in their flight feathers. Some, such as the Titicaca grebe and a number of the flightless rails, have a reduced number of primaries.

The remiges of ratites are soft and downy; they lack the interlocking hooks and barbules that help to stiffen the flight feathers of other birds. In addition, the emu's remiges are proportionately much reduced in size, while those of the cassowaries are reduced both in number and structure, consisting merely of five to six bare quills. Most ratites have completely lost their rectrices; only the ostrich still has them.

Penguins have lost their differentiated flight feathers. As adults, their wings and tail are covered with the same small, stiff, slightly curved feathers as are found on the rest of their bodies.

The ground-dwelling kākāpō, which is the world's only flightless parrot, has remiges which are shorter, rounder and more symmetrically vaned than those of parrots capable of flight; these flight feathers also contain fewer interlocking barbules near their tips.

== Moult ==
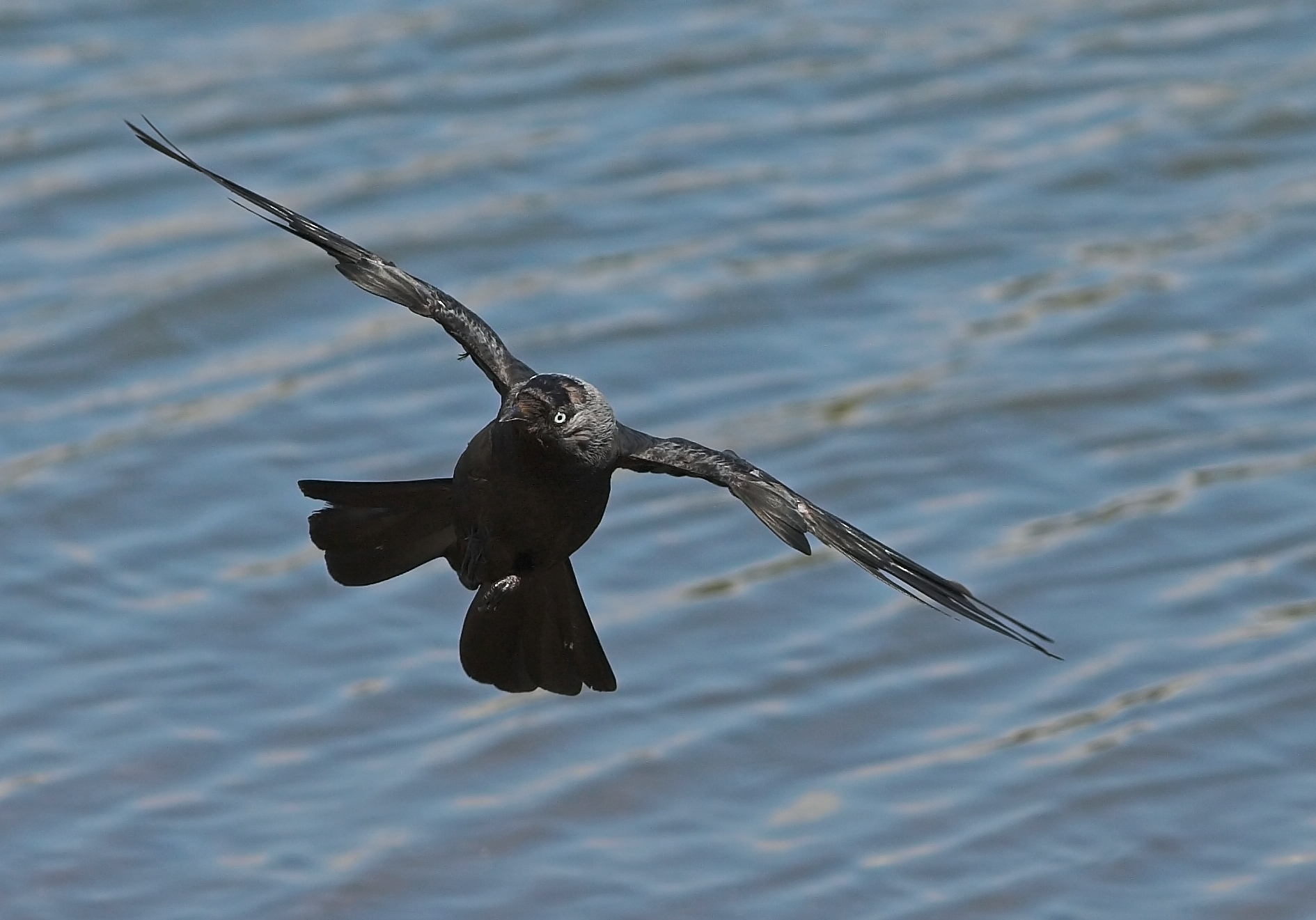
Eurasian jackdaw (Corvus monedula), showing moult of central rectrices

Once they have finished growing, feathers are essentially dead structures. Over time, they become worn and abraded, and need to be replaced. This replacement process is known as moult (molt in the United States). The loss of wing and tail feathers can affect a bird's ability to fly (sometimes dramatically) and in certain families can impair the ability to feed or perform courtship displays. The timing and progression of flight feather moult therefore varies among families.

For most birds, moult begins at a certain specific point, called a focus (plural foci), on the wing or tail and proceeds in a sequential manner in one or both directions from there. For example, most passerines have a focus between the innermost primary (P1, using the numbering scheme explained above) and outermost secondary (S1), and a focus point in the middle of the center pair of rectrices. As passerine moult begins, the two feathers closest to the focus are the first to drop. When replacement feathers reach roughly half of their eventual length, the next feathers in line (P2 and S2 on the wing, and both R2s on the tail) are dropped. This pattern of drop and replacement continues until moult reaches either end of the wing or tail. The speed of the moult can vary somewhat within a species. Some passerines that breed in the Arctic, for example, drop many more flight feathers at once (sometimes becoming briefly flightless) in order to complete their entire wing moult prior to migrating south, while those same species breeding at lower latitudes undergo a more protracted moult.

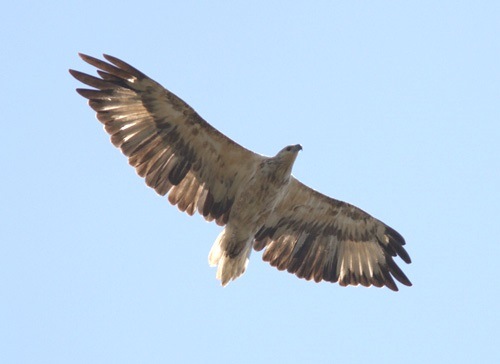
Young white-bellied sea eagle (Haliaeetus leucogaster) in flight, showing moult waves in wings

In many species, there is more than one focus along the wing. Here, moult begins at all foci simultaneously, but generally proceeds only in one direction. Most grouse, for example, have two wing foci: one at the wingtip, the other between feathers P1 and S1. In this case, moult proceeds descendantly from both foci. Many large, long-winged birds have multiple wing foci.

Birds that are heavily "wing-loaded"—that is, heavy-bodied birds with relatively short wings—have great difficulty flying with the loss of even a few flight feathers. A protracted moult like the one described above would leave them vulnerable to predators for a sizeable portion of the year. Instead, these birds lose all their flight feathers at once. This leaves them completely flightless for a period of three to four weeks, but means their overall period of vulnerability is significantly shorter than it would otherwise be. Eleven families of birds, including loons, grebes and most waterfowl, have this moult strategy.

The cuckoos show what is called saltatory or transilient wing moults. In simple forms, this involves the moulting and replacement of odd-numbered primaries and then the even-numbered primaries. There are however complex variations with differences based on life history.

Arboreal woodpeckers, which depend on their tails—particularly the strong central pair of rectrices—for support while they feed, have a unique tail moult. Rather than moulting their central tail feathers first, as most birds do, they retain these feathers until last. Instead, the second pair of rectrices (both R2 feathers) are the first to drop. (In some species in the genera Celeus and Dendropicos, the third pair is the first dropped.) The pattern of feather drop and replacement proceeds as described for passerines (above) until all other rectrices have been replaced; only then are the central tail rectrices moulted. This provides some protection to the growing feathers, since they're always covered by at least one existing feather, and also ensures that the bird's newly strengthened tail is best able to cope with the loss of the crucial central rectrices. Ground-feeding woodpeckers, such as the wrynecks, do not have this modified moult strategy; in fact, wrynecks moult their outer tail feathers first, with moult proceeding proximally from there.

== Age differences in flight feathers ==
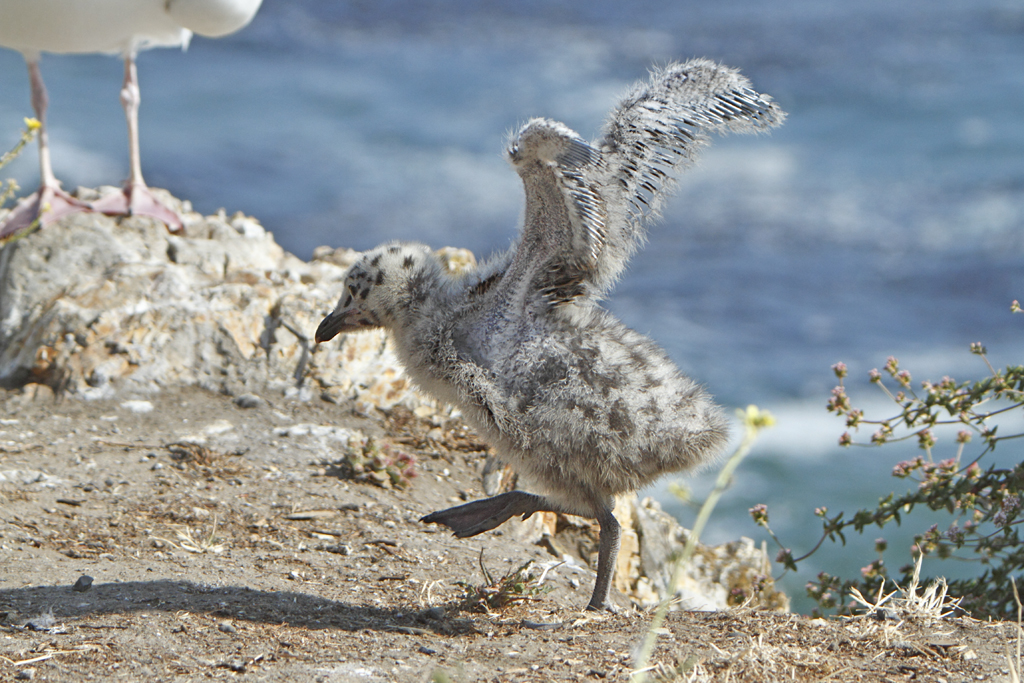
Western gull chick about 3 weeks old flapping its developing wings

There are often substantial differences between the remiges and rectrices of adults and juveniles of the same species. Because all juvenile feathers are grown at once—a tremendous energy burden to the developing bird—they are softer and of poorer quality than the equivalent feathers of adults, which are moulted over a longer period of time (as long as several years in some cases). As a result, they wear more quickly.

As feathers grow at variable rates, these variations lead to visible dark and light bands in the fully formed feather. These growth bars and their widths have been used to determine the daily nutritional status of birds. Each light and dark bar correspond to around 24 hours and the use of this technique has been called ptilochronology (analogous to dendrochronology).

In general, juveniles have feathers which are narrower and more sharply pointed at the tip. This can be particularly visible when the bird is in flight, especially in the case of raptors. The trailing edge of the wing of a juvenile bird can appear almost serrated, due to the feathers' sharp tips, while that of an older bird will be straighter-edged. The flight feathers of a juvenile bird will also be uniform in length, since they all grew at the same time. Those of adults will be of various lengths and levels of wear, since each is moulted at a different time.

The flight feathers of adults and juveniles can differ considerably in length, particularly among the raptors. Juveniles tend to have slightly longer rectrices and shorter, broader wings (with shorter outer primaries, and longer inner primaries and secondaries) than do adults of the same species. However, there are many exceptions. In longer-tailed species, such as swallow-tailed kite, secretary bird and European honey buzzard, for example, juveniles have shorter rectrices than adults do. Juveniles of some Buteo buzzards have narrower wings than adults do, while those of large juvenile falcons are longer. It is theorized that the differences help young birds compensate for their inexperience, weaker flight muscles and poorer flying ability.

== Wing formula ==
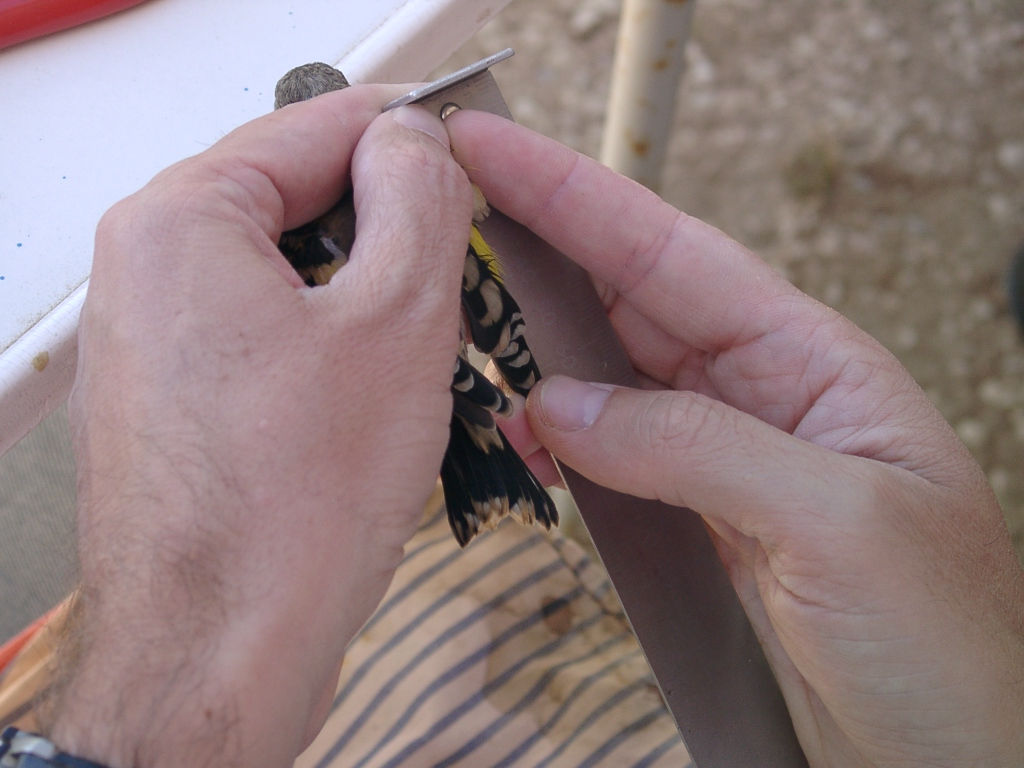
Measuring primary lengths, one of the steps in determining a bird's wing formula

A wing formula describes the shape of distal end of a bird's wing in a mathematical way. It can be used to help distinguish between species with similar plumages, and thus is particularly useful for those who ring (band) birds.

To determine a bird's wing formula, the distance between the tip of the most distal primary and the tip of its greater covert (the longest of the feathers that cover and protect the shaft of that primary) is measured in millimeters. In some cases, this results in a positive number (e.g., the primary extends beyond its greater covert), while in other cases it is a negative number (e.g. the primary is completely covered by the greater covert, as happens in some passerine species). Next, the longest primary feather is identified, and the differences between the length of that primary and that of all remaining primaries and of the longest secondary are also measured, again in millimeters. If any primary shows a notch or emargination, this is noted, and the distance between the feather's tip and any notch is measured, as is the depth of the notch. All distance measurements are made with the bird's wing closed, so as to maintain the relative positions of the feathers.

While there can be considerable variation across members of a species—and while the results are obviously impacted by the effects of moult and feather regeneration—even very closely related species show clear differences in their wing formulas.

== Primary extension ==
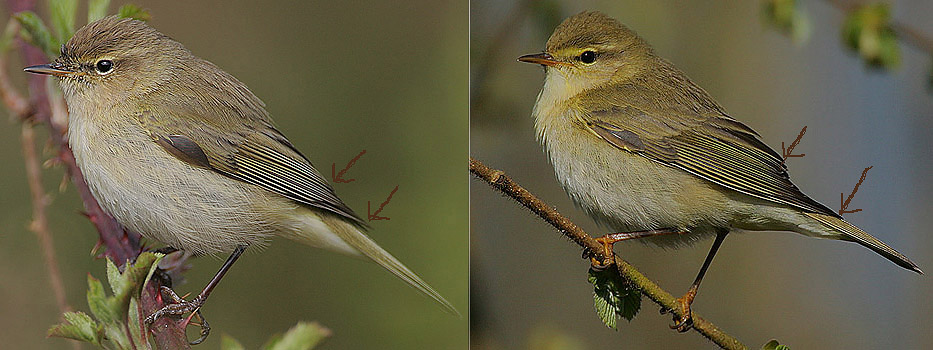
Comparison of primary extensions: chiffchaff (left) and willow warbler

The distance that a bird's longest primaries extend beyond its longest secondaries (or tertials) when its wings are folded is referred to as the primary extension or primary projection. As with wing formulae, this measurement is useful for distinguishing between similarly plumaged birds; however, unlike wing formulae, it is not necessary to have the bird in-hand to make the measurement. Rather, this is a useful relative measurement—some species have long primary extensions, while others have shorter ones. Among the Empidonax flycatchers of the Americas, for example, the dusky flycatcher has a much shorter primary extension than does the very similarly plumaged Hammond's flycatcher. Europe's common skylark has a long primary projection, while that of the near-lookalike Oriental skylark is very short.

As a general rule, species which are long-distance migrants will have longer primary projection than similar species which do not migrate or migrate shorter distances.

== See also ==
- Bird anatomy
- Bird flight
- Drumming (snipe)
- Pinioning
- Plumage
- Delayed feathering in chickens
