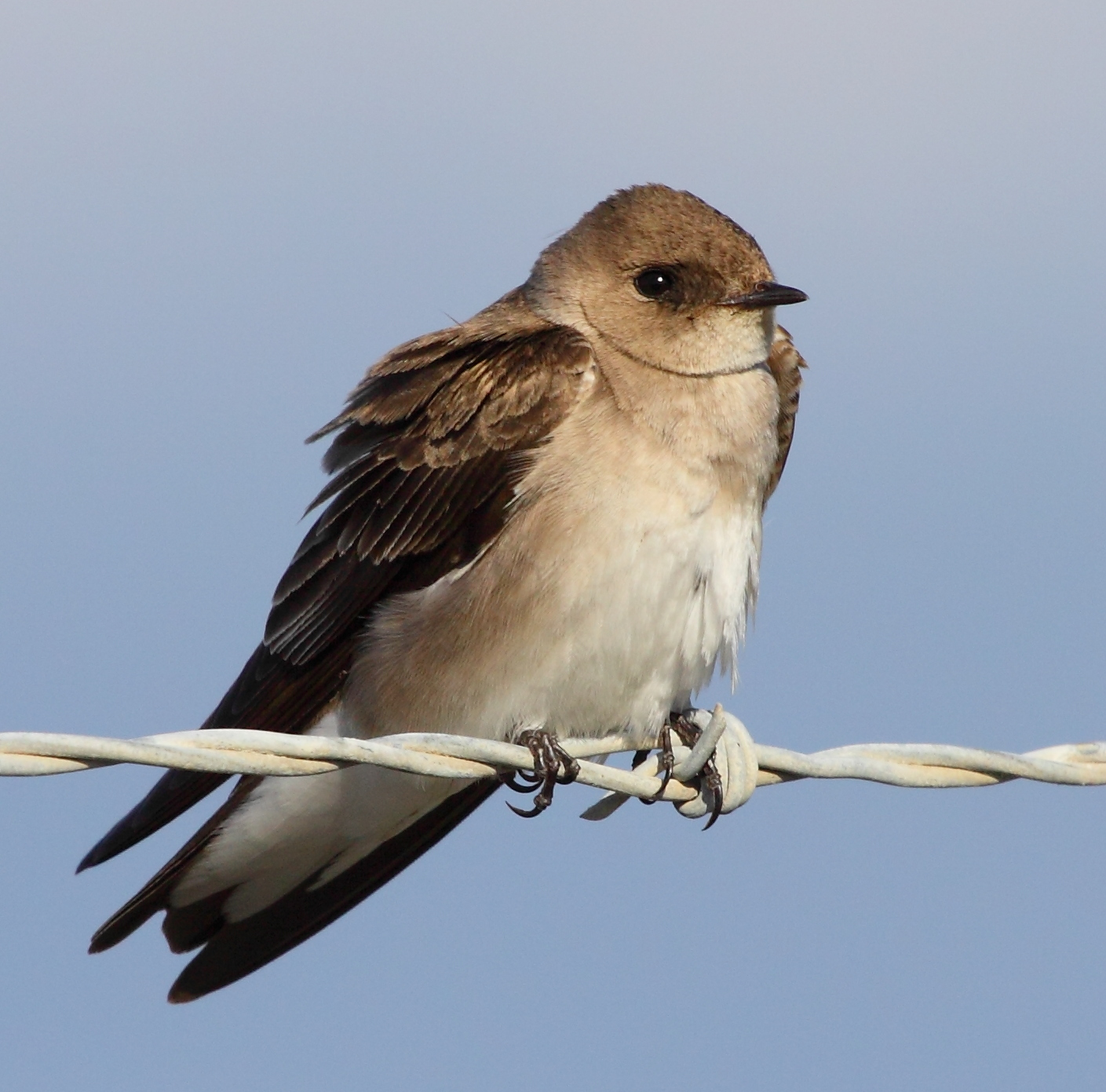

Scientific classification
- Kingdom: Animalia
- Phylum: Chordata
- Class: Aves
- Order: Passeriformes
- Family: Hirundinidae
- Subfamily: Hirundininae
- Genus: Stelgidopteryx; S.F. Baird, 1858

Type species
- Hirundo serripennis Audubon, 1838

Species
- S. serripennis S. ruficollis

= Stelgidopteryx =

Genus of birds

Stelgidopteryx (Baird, 1858) is a small genus of swallows. It contains two species:

| Image | Scientific name | Common name | Subspecies | Distribution |
|---|---|---|---|---|
| | Stelgidopteryx serripennis | Northern rough-winged swallow | * Ridgway's rough-winged swallow, Stelgidopteryx serripennis ridgwayi | North America |
| | Stelgidopteryx ruficollis | Southern rough-winged swallow | | partial migrant breeding in Central and South America |

Adults of both species are brown on top with lighter underparts and a slightly forked tail. They nest in cavities but do not excavate their holes or form colonies.

These birds forage in flight over water or fields, usually flying low. They eat insects.

"Rough-winged" refers to the serrated edge feathers on the wing of this genus; this feature would only be apparent in the hand.
