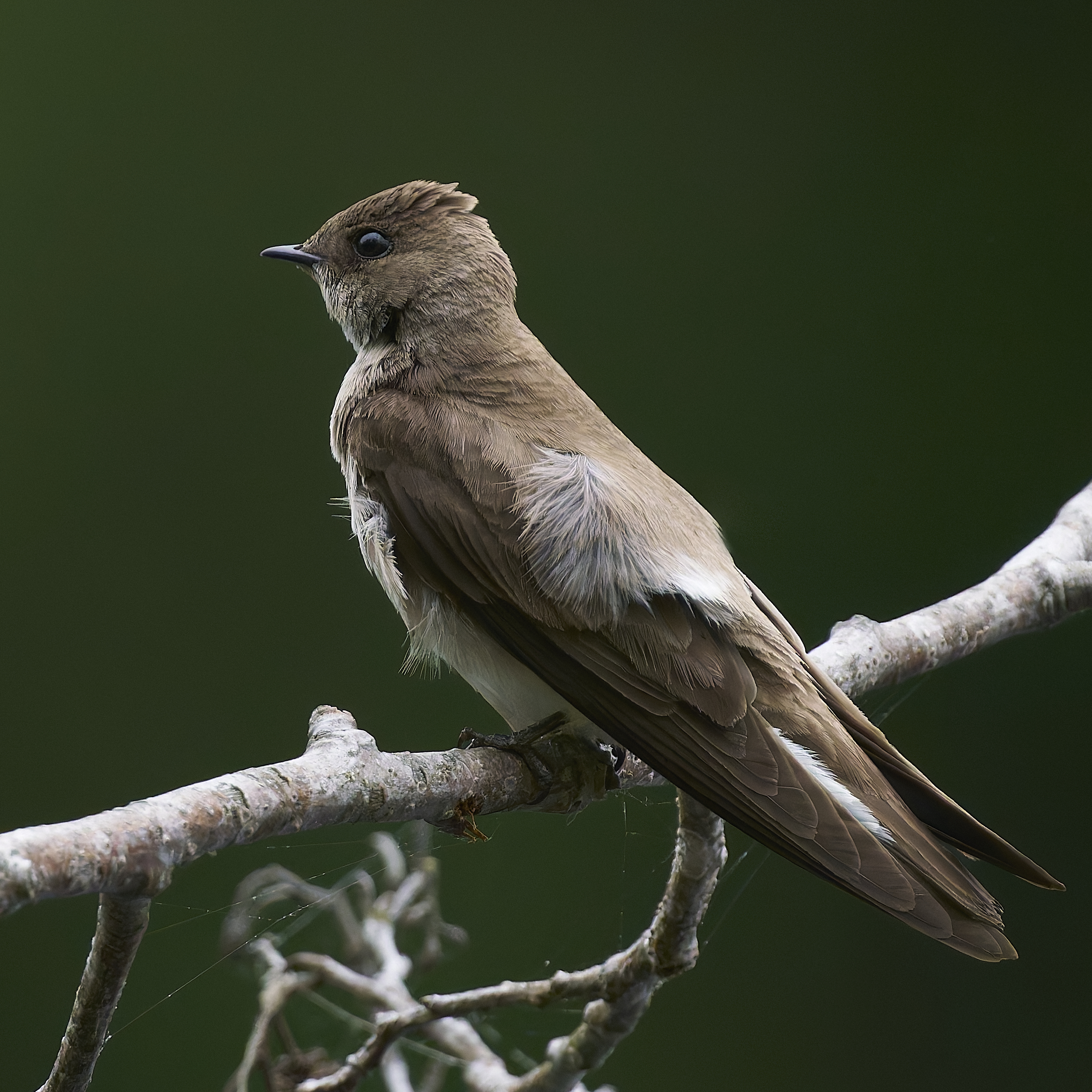
- Adult
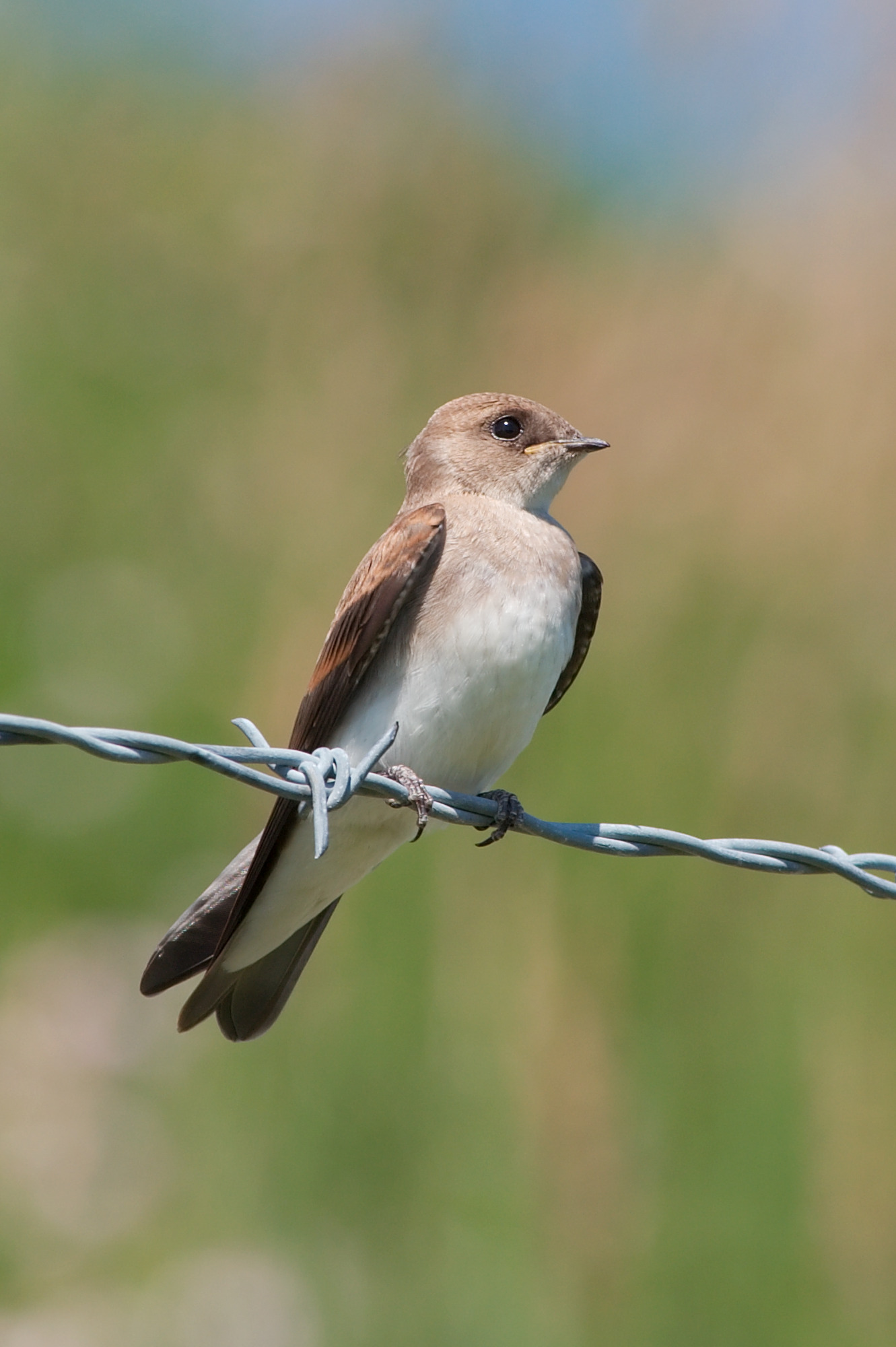
- Juvenile

Conservation status
- Least Concern (IUCN 3.1)

Scientific classification
- Kingdom: Animalia
- Phylum: Chordata
- Class: Aves
- Order: Passeriformes
- Family: Hirundinidae
- Genus: Stelgidopteryx
- Species: S. serripennis

Binomial name
- Stelgidopteryx serripennis (Audubon, 1838)

= Northern rough-winged swallow =

Species of bird

The northern rough-winged swallow (Stelgidopteryx serripennis) is a small, migratory swallow. It is very similar to the southern rough-winged swallow, Stelgidopteryx ruficollis.

== Taxonomy and etymology ==
The genus name, Stelgidopteryx, is from Ancient Greek and means "scraper wing" and the species name, serripennis, is derived from Latin and means "saw feather". In the common name, "rough-winged" refers to the serrated edge feathers on the wing of this bird; this feature would only be apparent when holding this bird.

=== Subspecies ===
Six subspecies of the northern rough-winged swallow are currently recognized.

- Stelgidopteryx serripennis serripennis is the nominate subspecies and can be found to occur in southern Alaska and Canada to the southern United States. They are found to usually winter in southern Florida and from southwestern Mexico to Panama. It was described by Audubon in 1838.
- Stelgidopteryx serripennis psammochrous was described by Ludlow Griscom in 1929. It breeds in the southwestern US and winters from central Mexico to Panama. It can be differentiated from the nominate race by being paler, especially on the crown and rump.
- Stelgidopteryx serripennis fulvipennis is a resident of central Mexico to Costa Rica. It was the first subspecies to be differentiated from the nominate race, serripennis, and was differentiated by Philip Sclater in 1860. It is darker above; the crown darker more so. The shafts of the undertail coverts, the feathers under the tail, covering the base, have been observed to be darker near the end. The throat of these swallows seems to be slightly buff, unlike most of the other subspecies.
- Stelgidopteryx serripennis stuarti, a very dark variant of the northern rough-winged swallow, was described by Pierce Brodkorb in 1942. It is resident to the southern Mexico lowlands and south to eastern Guatemala. Like the race fulvipennis, it has a slightly buff throat. The undertail coverts also have black tips.
- Stelgidopteryx serripennis ridgwayi, described by Edward Nelson in 1901, is a subspecies resident to the northern Yucatán Peninsula. It is larger than the nominate race with a whitish spot above its lores and has blackish tips on the longest of its undertail coverts. In addition, it is darker above and has paler anterior underparts.
- Stelgidopteryx serripennis burleighi, described by Allan Robert Phillips in 1986, is the most recent, widely accepted subspecies. It is resident to Belize and Guatemala, and is the darkest of the subspecies.

It has been proposed that another race aphracta be recognized, but this is debated. This race is apparently described as being darker above with a greyer throat compared to serripennis. It has been described as occurring in the western Great Basin region, in the United States.

== Description ==
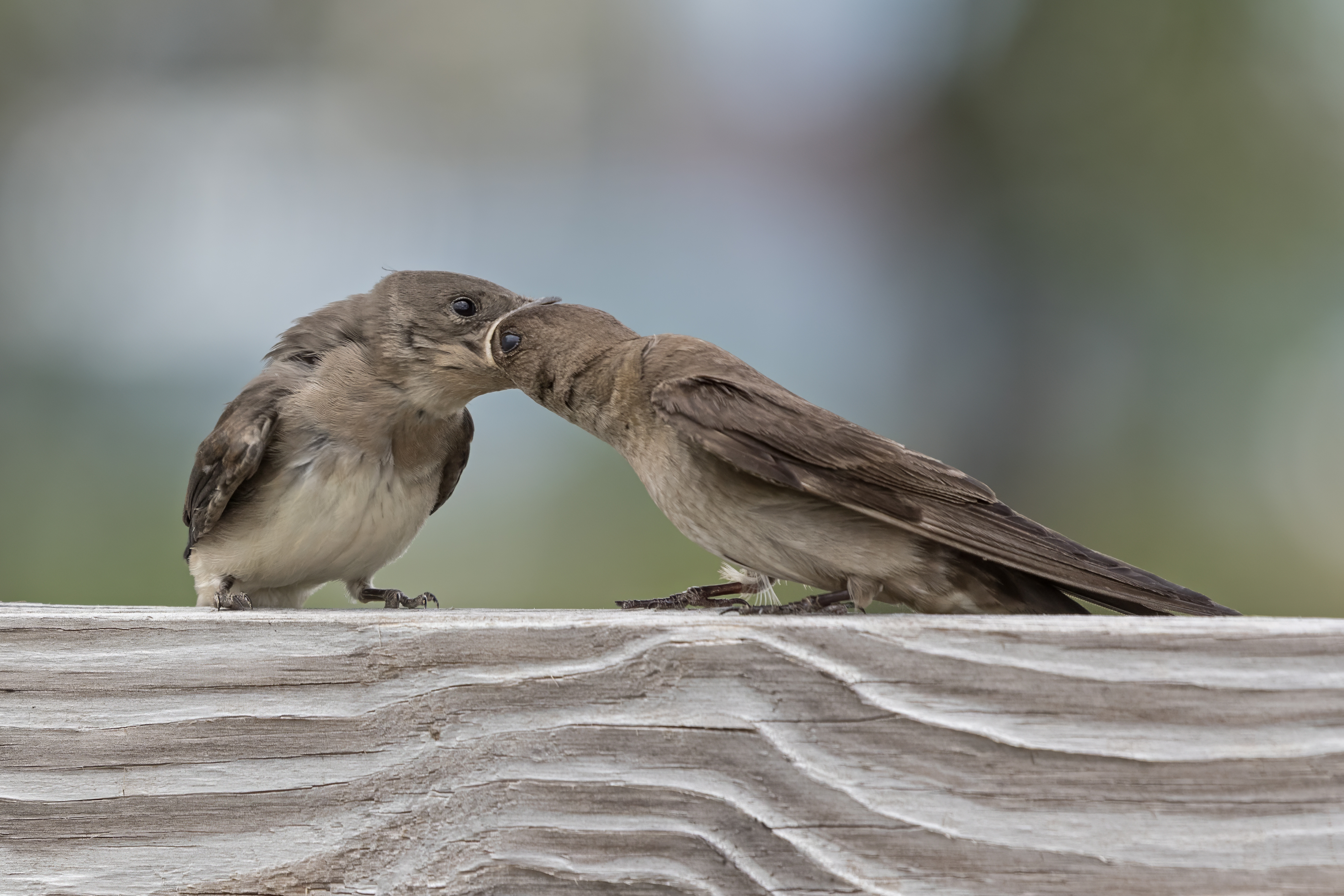
An adult northern rough-winged swallow (right) feeds its young.

Adults are 13–15 cm (5.1–5.9 in) in length, brown above with white underparts, a small bill, and a forked tail. Their throat is white with a brownish-grey wash, and below the throat are white underparts. The adults have a wingspan of 27–30 cm (11–12 in) and a weight of 10–18 g (0.35–0.63 oz). The males' undertail coverts are longer and broader than those of the females. The males also have hooked barbs on the outer web of their outer primary wings. The barbs on the females are shorter and straighter than those of the males. Juveniles can be distinguished from adults by their reddish-brown wing-bars.

They are similar in appearance to the bank swallow, but have a dusky throat and breast. They are closely related and very similar to the southern rough-winged swallow, Stelgidopteryx ruficollis, but that species has a more contrasting rump, and the ranges do not quite overlap.

=== Call ===
The call of this swallow is described as a short, harsh zeep. It has also been described as a rough, low bzzt. It is often doubled. This call is similar to the call of the bank swallow.

== Distribution ==
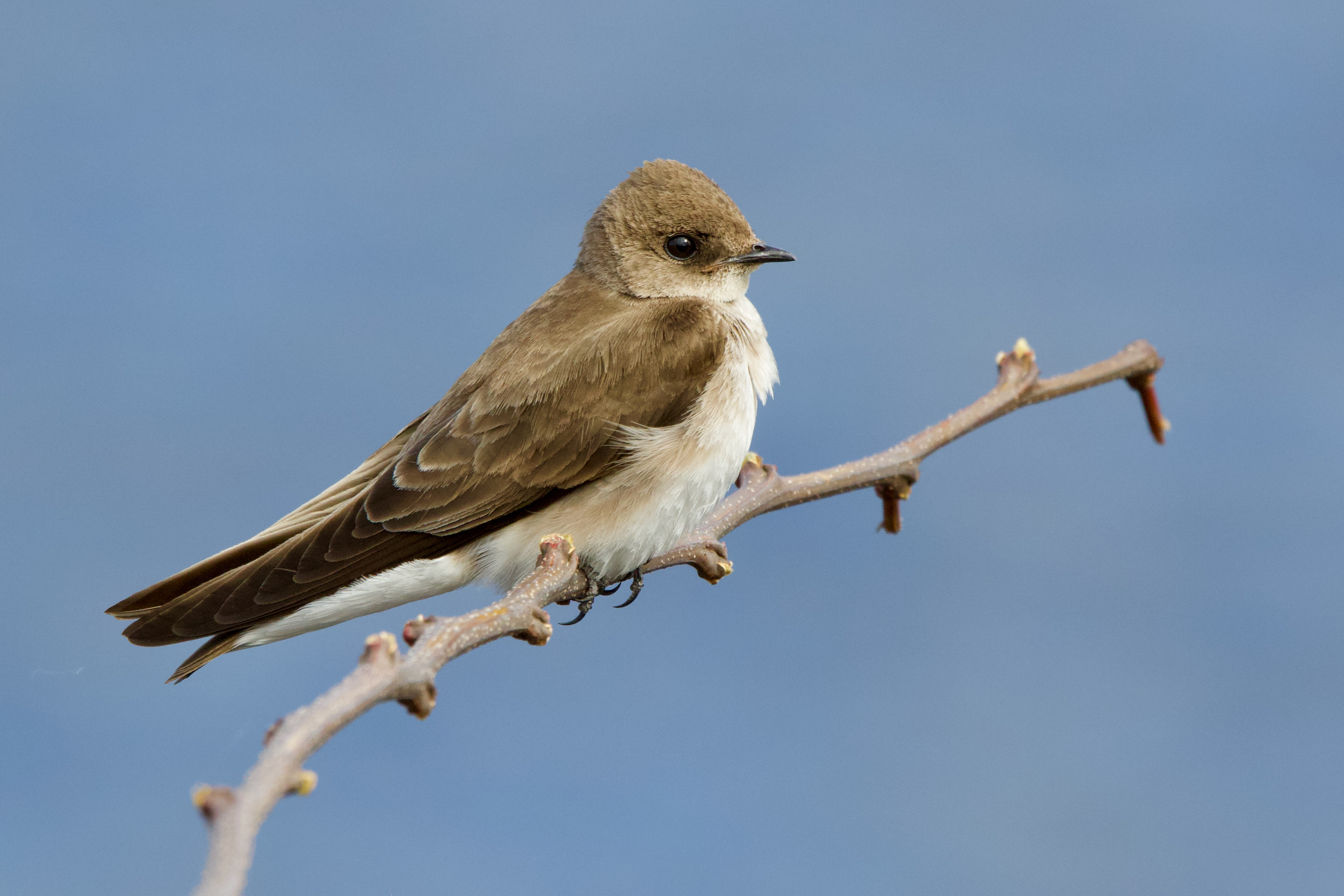
Northern rough-winged swallow photographed in central Maine, the northeastern limit of the species' breeding range.

The northern rough-winged swallow is native to Bahamas, Belize, Canada, Cayman Islands, Costa Rica, Cuba, El Salvador, Guatemala, Haiti, Honduras, Jamaica, Mexico, Nicaragua, Panama, Puerto Rico, Saint Pierre and Miquelon, Turks and Caicos Islands, and the United States. They are vagrant to Aruba, Barbados, Bonaire, Sint Eustatius and Saba, Curaçao, Dominican Republic, Guadeloupe, and Sint Maarten. The populations in the US and Canada have been found to winter in the southernmost US and further south. While this is true, the populations in Mexico and further south seem to be non-migratory, although local post-breeding movements do occur. This swallow has been found to occur as high as 2,500 m (8,200 ft) in Costa Rica.

== Behaviour ==
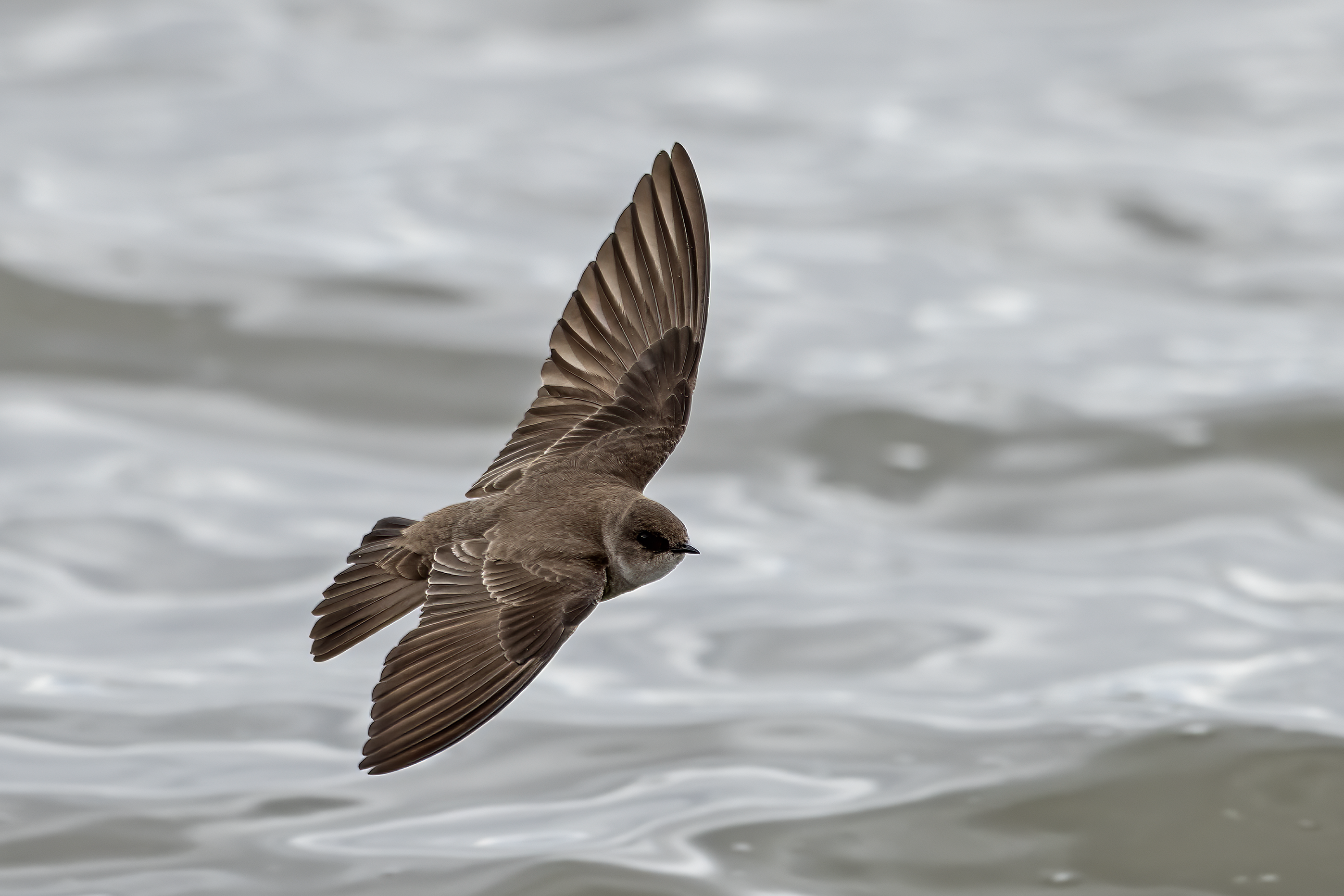
In flight over the impoundment at the Heinz NWR in Philadelphia

=== Nesting and breeding ===
The northern rough-winged swallow usually nests by itself, although sometimes it is found in loose groups, often at the edge of bank swallow colonies, of up to 25 pairs. The nests are found in burrows located in soil banks, very occasionally caves and trees, and in human-made cavities such as gutters and tubes. These burrows are usually built by other species, and measure anywhere from 20 to 200 cm (7.9 to 78.7 in) in length, although most fall between 30 and 100 cm (11.8 and 39.4 in). They are at a height of around 0.2 to 30 m (0.7 to 98.4 ft) above ground-level. The nest itself is built by this species, and made with a variety of fibres, including grasses, leaves, rootlets, twigs, bark, and pine needles. Moss and dung are also used. The nest is then lined with grass. These materials are wholly or almost wholly collected by the female.

The breeding season generally extends from May to about mid-July, but this varies by region. In north-eastern North America, the breeding season starts about mid-May, while it starts in early June in the north-west, with both ending in August. In the southern parts of its range, this bird lays its eggs earlier; for example, from mid-April to mid-May in Costa Rica.

The northern rough-winged swallow lays a single clutch, although sometimes another clutch is laid if the first one fails, of four to eight glossy white eggs that measure about 20 by 14 mm (0.79 by 0.55 in) on average. It has been observed that the clutch size decreases with decreasing latitude. These eggs are incubated by the female for 16 to 18 days. Because the female starts incubating as soon as the first egg is laid, the eggs hatch asynchronously.

==== Migration habits ====
The northern rough-winged swallow migrates to the Gulf Coast of the United States and south to Central America for winter. They have also been recorded to winter in the Caribbean.

When the breeding season is finished, they usually form large flocks and roost together in marshes and similar environments. Sometimes, in adverse weather conditions, several of these swallows can be seen to share a burrow.

=== Diet ===
When foraging, their flight paths are low and direct. They fly with slow, deep wingbeats interspersed with periods of gliding. They usually feed over water and occasionally over land. They are insectivores, feeding almost exclusively on flying insects. Although this is true, there is a report of some feeding on cracked corn. To drink, they skim the surface of the water with their wing and then drink on their wing.

== Conservation status ==
The northern rough-winged swallow is classified as least concern by the IUCN. Although its population is declining, it is not declining fast enough nor is its range small enough to justify a classification of vulnerable. In addition, its population is estimated to be 27 million mature individuals as of 2025, so it is not vulnerable under the population size criterion. This swallow has been found to adapt well to humans and sometimes nests in artificial cavities created by them.
