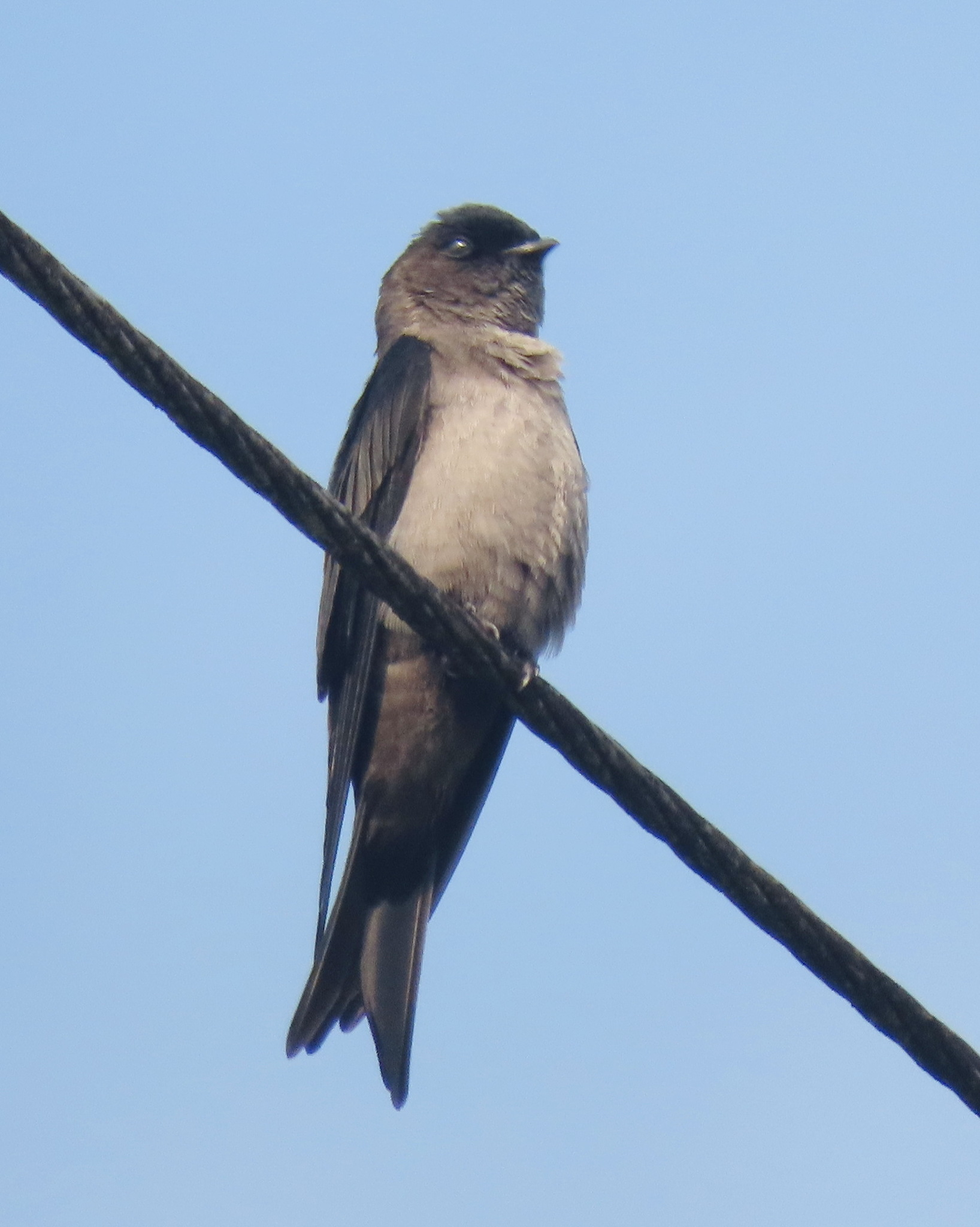

Conservation status
- Least Concern (IUCN 3.1)

Scientific classification
- Kingdom: Animalia
- Phylum: Chordata
- Class: Aves
- Order: Passeriformes
- Family: Hirundinidae
- Genus: Atticora
- Species: A. tibialis

Binomial name
- Atticora tibialis (Cassin, 1853)

= White-thighed swallow =

Species of bird

The white-thighed swallow (Atticora tibialis) is a species of bird in the family Hirundinidae, the swallows and martins. It is found in Bolivia, Brazil, Colombia, Ecuador, French Guiana, Guyana, Panama, Peru, Suriname, and Venezuela.

== Taxonomy and systematics ==
The white-thighed swallow was described in 1853 by John Cassin as "Petrochelidon ? tibialis". Cassin was unsure that it belonged in that genus, stating that it "does not appear to us to belong to either of the genera of swallows heretofore established", which were Petrochelidon and Collocalia. (The latter genus is now applied to some swifts.) In the late 1800s it was assigned to genus Microchelidon and for much of the twentieth century and into the twenty-first it was assigned to the monotypic genus Neochelidon. Based in part on a study published in 2005, beginning in 2008 Neochelidon was merged into the present genus Atticora.

The white-thighed swallow and the black-capped swallow (A. pileata) are sister species and share genus Atticora with the white-banded swallow (A. fasciata). The white-thighed swallow has these three subspecies:

- Atticora tibialis minima (Chapman, 1924)
- Atticora tibialis griseiventris (Chapman, 1924)
- Atticora tibialis tibialis (Cassin, 1853)

== Description ==
The white-thighed swallow averages about 12 cm (4.7 in) long and weighs 8.5 to 14 g (0.30 to 0.49 oz). The sexes have the same plumage. Adults of the nominate subspecies A. t. tibialis have a brownish black head with a slight green sheen, black lores, and gray-brown cheeks and throat. Their back is brownish black with a slight green sheen and their rump gray-brown. Their tail is slightly forked and brownish black. Their wings are mostly brownish black with slightly lighter tips on the greater coverts and tertials. Their underparts are gray-brown with the eponymous white feather tufts on their lower legs. Subspecies A. t. minima is smaller and overall darker than the nominate. A. t. griseiventris is larger and glossier than the nominate, with a grayer rump and underparts. All subspecies generally have a dark brown iris, bill, and legs and feet, though a few individuals of A. t. minima have differed.

== Distribution and habitat ==
The white-thighed swallow has a disjunct distribution, with each subspecies being separate from the others. They are found thus:

- Atticora tibialis minima: from Coclé Province in central Panama south through western Colombia into western Ecuador as far as western Azuay Province
- Atticora tibialis griseiventris: from Venezuela's southern Bolívar and eastern Amazonas states south across a bit of northwestern Brazil, eastern and southern Colombia, eastern Ecuador, and eastern Peru into northern Bolivia and east across Brazil south of the Amazon River Separately from extreme eastern Guyana east through Suriname into French Guiana
- Atticora tibialis tibialis: southeastern Brazil mostly from southern Bahia south to eastern São Paulo state with records as far north as Pernambuco

The white-thighed swallow primarily inhabits the edges and clearings of lowland evergreen forest in the tropical zone. It also occurs in more open country with scattered trees and along rivers. In elevation overall it ranges from sea level to about 1,200 m (3,900 ft). In Colombia it reaches 1,100 m (3,600 ft), in western Ecuador 800 m (2,600 ft), in eastern Ecuador and Peru 1,250 m (4,100 ft), in Venezuela 900 m (3,000 ft), and in Brazil mostly to 1,000 m (3,300 ft) and locally higher.

== Behavior ==
=== Movement ===
The white-thighed swallow is a year-round resident throughout its range.

=== Feeding ===
The white-thighed swallow feeds on insects captured on the wing, and is usually seen in pairs or small flocks. Though details of its diet are lacking, it is known to include beetles (Coleoptera), true bugs (Hemiptera), and members of Hymenoptera.

=== Breeding ===
The white-thighed swallow's breeding season has not been determined. It includes January to May in Colombia and appears to span at least February to August in Panama. The species nests in cavities in trees (both natural and those excavated by other species) and in burrows in earthen banks; it does not excavate the cavities. It does nest near human habitations but is not known to nest in artificial structures. It makes a nest of dried grasses within the cavity or burrow. The clutch size, incubation period, time to fledging, and details of parental care are not known.

=== Vocalization ===
The white-thighed swallow's calls include "a thin, high-pitched tsee-tit and a chit-it, chee-dee-dit?. While foraging they make a "constant, soft zeet-zeet call.

== Status ==
The IUCN has assessed the white-thighed swallow as being of Least Concern. It has a very large range; its estimated population of at least 500,000 mature individuals is believed to be decreasing. No immediate threats have been identified. It is considered common in Colombia, "local and generally scarce" in Ecuador, common in its main Venezuelan range and rare and local outside it, and "uncommon to rare" in Brazil. The species is "often seen near roads and farm clearings, suggesting that they may benefit from human activities which increase edge habitat".
