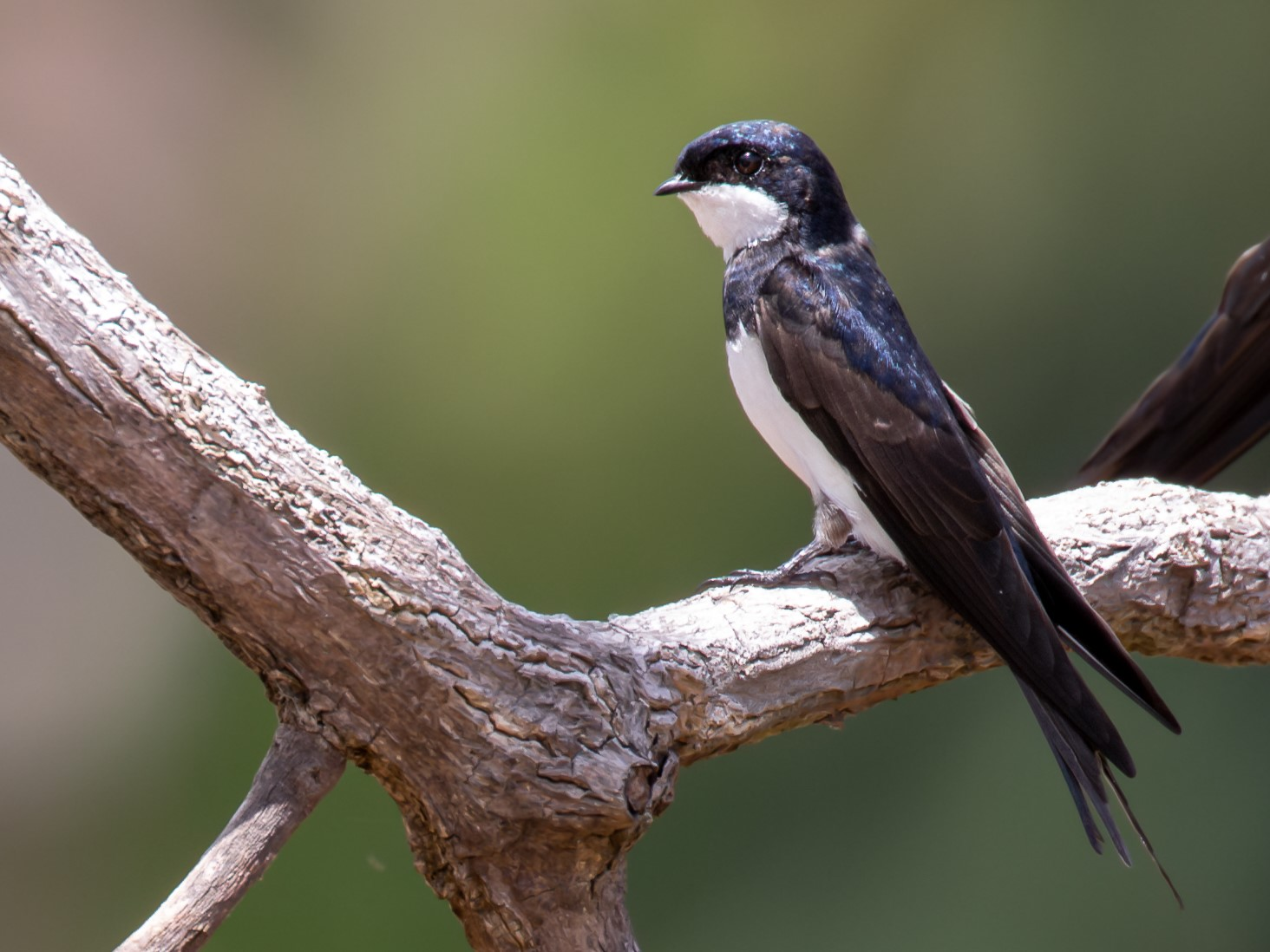

Conservation status
- Least Concern (IUCN 3.1)

Scientific classification
- Kingdom: Animalia
- Phylum: Chordata
- Class: Aves
- Order: Passeriformes
- Family: Hirundinidae
- Genus: Pygochelidon
- Species: P. melanoleuca

Binomial name
- Pygochelidon melanoleuca (Wied-Neuwied, 1820)

Synonyms
- See text

= Black-collared swallow =

Species of bird

The black-collared swallow (Pygochelidon melanoleuca) is a species of bird in the family Hirundinidae, the swallows and martins. It is found in Argentina, Bolivia, Brazil, Colombia, French Guiana, Guyana, Suriname, Venezuela, and possibly Paraguay.

== Taxonomy and systematics ==
The black-collared swallow was originally described as Hirundo melanoleuca. It was later moved to genus Atticora but following a study published in 2005 it was moved to the resurrected genus Pygochelidon that had been erected in 1865.

The black-collared swallow shares genus Pygochelidon with the blue-and-white swallow (P. cyanoleuca). It is monotypic.

== Description ==
The black-collared swallow is about 14 cm (5.5 in) long and weighs 10 to 12 g (0.35 to 0.42 oz). The sexes have the same plumage. Adults have a mostly glossy blue-black head and neck with a white throat. Their upperparts are glossy blue-black. Their tail is deeply forked and blackish. Their wings are blackish. Their underparts are mostly white with a blue-black band across the breast. Juveniles have duller and browner heads and upperparts than adults, dirty white underparts, and a shorter tail.

== Distribution and habitat ==
The black-collared swallow has a highly disjunct distribution. One population is found from eastern Colombia into southwestern Venezuela and across central Venezuela east through extreme northern Brazil and the Guianas and also south of that band along the upper Negro River in northwestern Brazil. A second population is found from extreme northeastern Bolivia across Amazonian Brazil south of the Amazon River into the watersheds of the Madeira, Tapajós, Xingu, and Tocantins rivers. A third, much smaller, population is found in the area of Iguaçu Falls along the Argentina-Brazil border. That population possibly extends into Paraguay, where the South American Classification Committee has unconfirmed records. There are also scattered records at several locations from southeastern to northeastern Brazil.

The black-collared swallow inhabits riverine belts, especially blackwater rivers, where it favors areas near waterfalls and along rapids. It elevation it reaches only about 300 m (1,000 ft) above sea level.

== Behavior ==
=== Movement ===
The black-collared swallow is mostly a year-round resident. However, it makes some irregular seasonal movements in Venezuela, where at some locations it is rare or absent during periods of high water.

=== Feeding ===
The black-collared swallow feeds on insects captured in mid-air; its diet is known to include flies (Diptera), ants and wasps (Hymenoptera), and bugs (Homoptera). It forages singly, in pairs, and in small flocks that may include other swallow species. It usually flies low over the water but also circles slowly above it and glides high over the nearby forest.

=== Breeding ===
The black-collared swallow's breeding season has not been fully defined. It includes February to March in Venezuela and February in Suriname. One pair was seen collecting nesting material in Goiás, Brazil, in July. The species nests in holes or crevices in rocky outcrops or earthen banks where it makes a nest of dry grass lined with feathers. Clutches of three eggs have been documented. The incubation period, time to fledging, and details of parental care are not known.

=== Vocalization ===
The black-collared swallow's vocalization has been described as an "unstructured series of zr notes", "a buzzy jtt", and a "buzzy jit".

== Status ==
The IUCN has assessed the black-collared swallow as being of Least Concern. It has a very large range; its population size is not known and is believed to be stable. No immediate threats have been identified. However, contemplated and planned hydroelectric plants along its habitat rivers pose a threat by inundating the flowing water areas along which it nests and feeds. It is considered common in its relatively small Colombian range and "uncommon to locally fairly common" in Venezuela. It is described as "frequent to uncommon" overall in Brazil but Brazilian authorities consider it Near Threatened overall and Critically Endangered in Minas Gerais.
