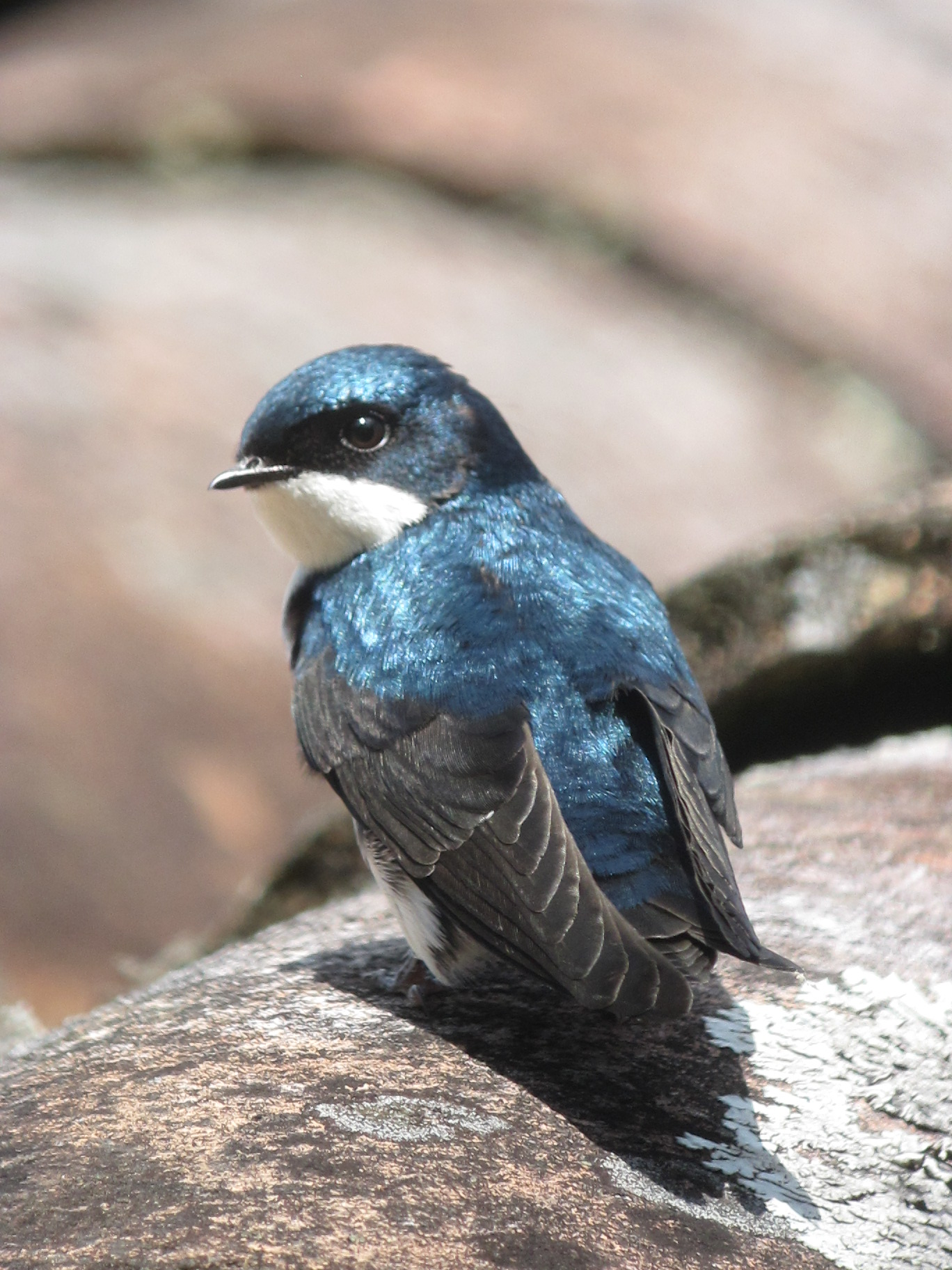
- Blue-and-white swallow (Pygochelidon cyanoleuca)

Scientific classification
- Kingdom: Animalia
- Phylum: Chordata
- Class: Aves
- Order: Passeriformes
- Family: Hirundinidae
- Genus: Pygochelidon; S.F. Baird, 1865

Type species
- Hirundo cyanoleuca blue-and-white swallow Vieillot, 1817

= Pygochelidon =

Genus of birds

Pygochelidon is a genus of birds in the swallow family Hirundinidae that occur in the Neotropics.

== Taxonomy ==
The genus Pygochelidon was introduced in 1865 by the American naturalist Spencer Fullerton Baird with the blue-and-white swallow as the type species. The name combines the Ancient Greek pugē meaning "rump" with khelidōn meaning "swallow".

This genus was formerly treated as a junior synonym of the genus Notiochelidon. It was resurrected to contain a clade of two species based on a genetic study published in 2005.

=== Species ===
The genus contains the following two species:

Image	Common name	Scientific name	Distribution
	Blue-and-white swallow	Pygochelidon cyanoleuca	Breeds from Nicaragua south throughout South America, except in the deserts and the Amazon Basin; southern race migratory, wintering as far north as Trinidad.
	Black-collared swallow	Pygochelidon melanoleuca	Argentina, Bolivia, Brazil, Colombia, French Guiana, Guyana, Suriname, Venezuela, and possibly Paraguay.
