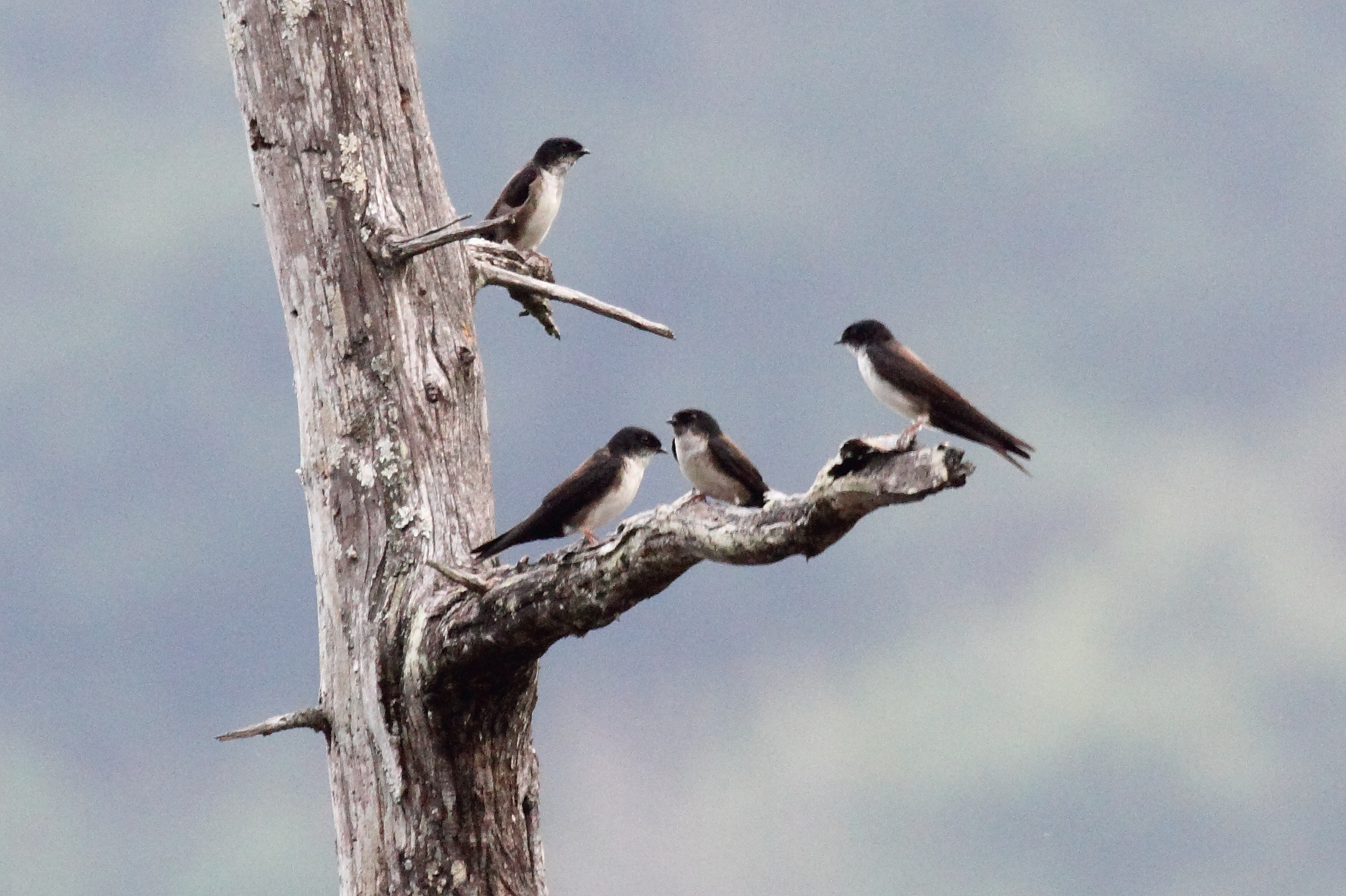

Conservation status
- Least Concern (IUCN 3.1)

Scientific classification
- Kingdom: Animalia
- Phylum: Chordata
- Class: Aves
- Order: Passeriformes
- Family: Hirundinidae
- Genus: Atticora
- Species: A. pileata

Binomial name
- Atticora pileata Gould, 1858
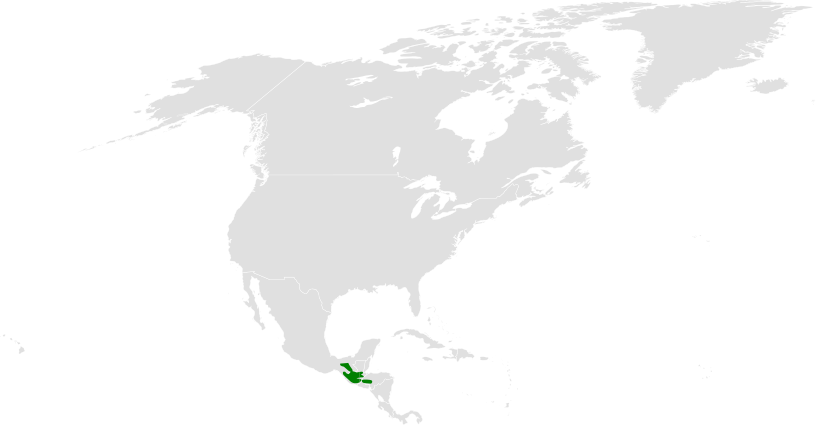

= Black-capped swallow =

Species of bird

The black-capped swallow (Atticora pileata) is a species of bird in the family Hirundinidae, the swallows and martins. It is found in Guatemala, El Salvador, Honduras, and Mexico.

== Taxonomy and systematics ==
The black-capped swallow was described in 1858 as Atticora pileata. For much of the twentieth century and into the twenty-first it was reclassified in genus Notiochelidon. Based in part on a study published in 2005, beginning in 2016 taxonomic systems returned it to Atticora.

The black-capped swallow is monotypic.

== Description ==
The black-capped swallow is about 11.5 to 13.5 cm (4.5 to 5.3 in) long and weighs about 12 g (0.42 oz). The sexes have the same plumage. Adults have a glossy black head with brown-speckled white cheeks and throat. Their back is sepia brown, their rump a darker brown, and their uppertail coverts dark sooty brown. Their tail longish, forked, and dull sooty black. Their wing's lesser coverts are black to brownish black, their secondary and inner greater coverts are dark grayish brown, and their flight feathers brownish black. The center of their breast and their belly are white, their flanks grayish brown, and their undertail coverts sooty black or very dark sooty brown. They have a brown iris, a black bill, and brown legs and feet. Juveniles are browner and less glossy than adults with a buffy chin and throat and pale cinnamon edges on their upperparts' feathers.

== Distribution and habitat ==
The black-capped swallow has a disjunct distribution. It is found in the central part of the southern Mexican state of Chiapas, from southwestern Chiapas into most of Guatemala, and from extreme northern El Salvador into western Honduras. It inhabits the interior, edges, and clearings of pine-oak forest, pine forest, and cloudforest in the subtropical and temperate zones. Sources differ on its elevational range. One states it is 1,600 to 3,100 m (5,200 to 10,200 ft) and another says 1,000 to 3,000 m (3,300 to 9,800 ft). A third gives its elevational range outside Mexico as 750 to 2,650 m (2,500 to 8,700 ft).

== Behavior ==
=== Movement ===
The black-capped swallow is generally considered a year-round resident. It is known to wander in Chiapas. It apparently has bred in Honduras only since the late 1900s.

=== Feeding ===
The black-capped swallow feeds only on insects that it captures in flight, though specific details of its diet are lacking. It sometimes forages in small flocks.

=== Breeding ===
The black-capped swallow's breeding season has not been fully defined but appears to span February to April in Mexico and include May and June in El Salvador. It sometimes nests in small colonies. It nests in burrows in earthen banks and in rock crevices. It is not clear whether it can excavate its own burrow or is dependent on other species's abandoned burrows. In the burrow or crevice it makes a cup nest of pine needles, leaves, twigs, and mud that is sometimes lined with feathers. The usual clutch is four eggs. Both sexes build the nest and provision nestlings. The incubation period and time to fledging are not known.

=== Vocalization ===
The black-capped swallow's calls "include a buzzy electric pzzzzzeeet! and a more liquid pweeet-pweeet".

== Status ==
The IUCN has assessed the black-capped swallow as being of Least Concern. Its population of at least 50,000 mature individuals is believed to be decreasing. No immediate threats have been identified. It is under "special protection" in Mexico and considered "uncommon to fairly common" outside that country. The species is "often seen near roads and farm clearings, suggesting that they may benefit from human activities that increase edge habitat".
