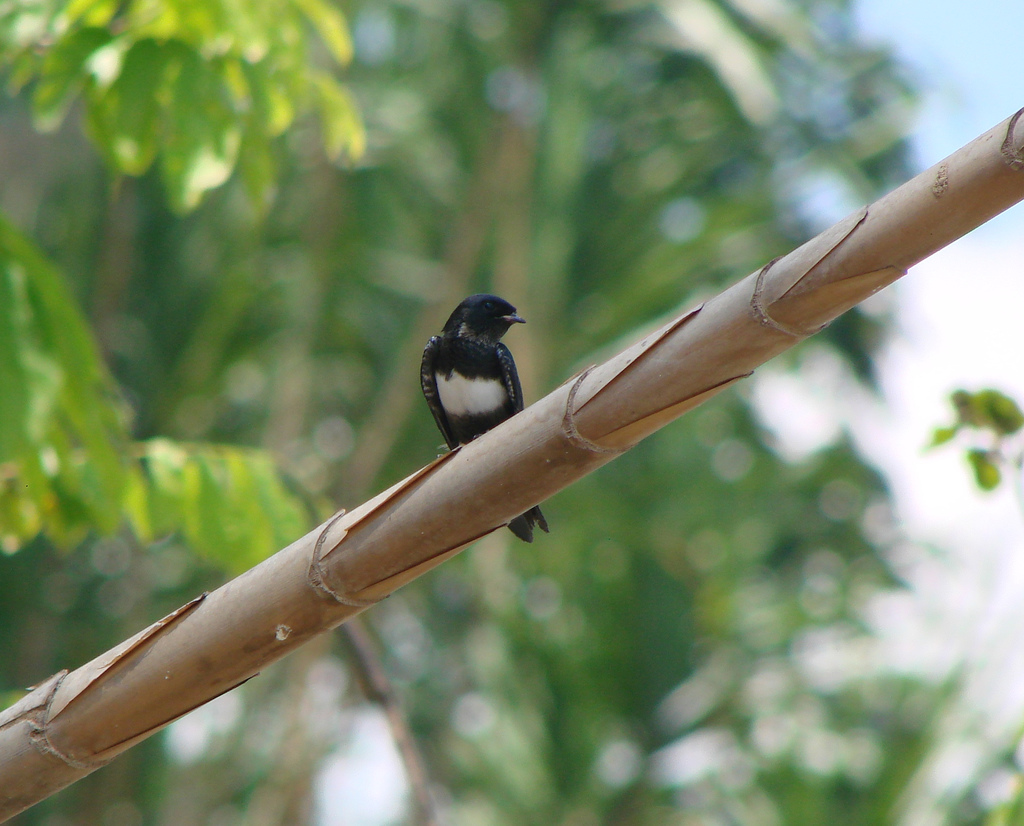
- White-banded swallow (Atticora fasciata)

Scientific classification
- Kingdom: Animalia
- Phylum: Chordata
- Class: Aves
- Order: Passeriformes
- Family: Hirundinidae
- Subfamily: Hirundininae
- Genus: Atticora; Gould, 1842

Type species
- Hirundo fasciata Gmelin, JF, 1789

= Atticora =

Genus of birds

Atticora is a genus of bird in the swallow family Hirundinidae that are found in South America.

== Species ==
The genus Atticora was introduced in 1842 by the English ornithologist John Gould with the white-banded swallow as the type species. The name combines the Ancient Greek Atthi meaning "Athenian" and kora meaning "maiden".

The genus contains three species:

Image	Common name	Scientific name	Distribution
	White-banded swallow	Atticora fasciata	Bolivia, Brazil, Colombia, Ecuador, French Guiana, Guyana, Peru, Suriname, and Venezuela
	Black-capped swallow	Atticora pileata	south Mexico to west El Salvador
	White-thighed swallow	Atticora tibialis	Panama to west Ecuador, west Amazonia
