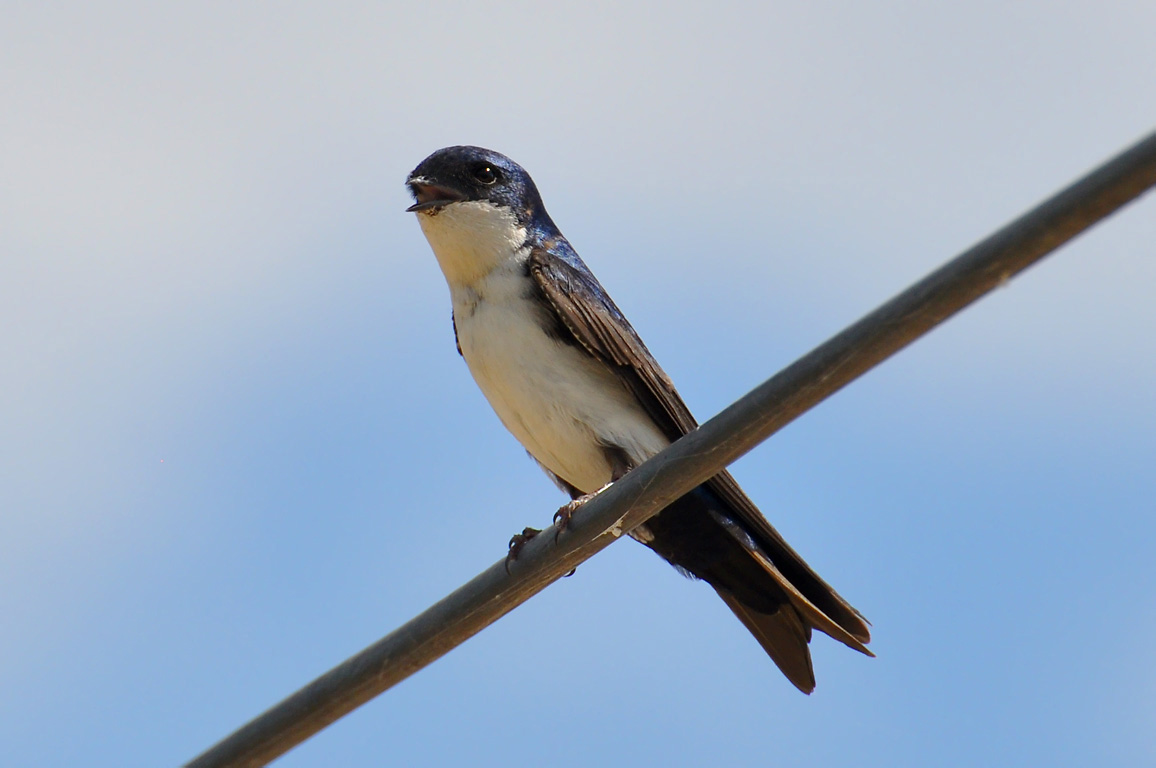
- In Rio Grande do Sul, Brazil

Conservation status
- Least Concern (IUCN 3.1)

Scientific classification
- Kingdom: Animalia
- Phylum: Chordata
- Class: Aves
- Order: Passeriformes
- Family: Hirundinidae
- Genus: Pygochelidon
- Species: P. cyanoleuca

Binomial name
- Pygochelidon cyanoleuca (Vieillot, 1817)
- Range map of Blue-and-white Swallow (Pygochelidon cyanoleuca) Breeding Year-round Non-breeding

Synonyms
- Hirundo cyanoleuca Vieillot, 1817; Notiochelidon cyanoleuca Pyrochelidon cyanoleuca

= Blue-and-white swallow =

Species of bird

The blue-and-white swallow (Pygochelidon cyanoleuca) is a passerine bird that breeds from Nicaragua south throughout South America, except in the deserts and the Amazon Basin. The southern race is migratory, wintering as far north as Trinidad, where it is a regular visitor. The nominate northern race may have bred on that island.

== Taxonomy ==
The blue-and-white swallow was first formally described as Hirundo cyanoleuca by the French ornithologist Louis Pierre Vieillot in 1817, based on a specimen he believed to be from Paraguay. The scientific name has the same meaning as the English common name.

This species was formerly placed in the genus Notiochelidon. It was moved to the resurrected genus Pygochelidon based on a phylogenetic study published in 2005.

Three subspecies are recognised:

- P. c. cyanoleuca (Vieillot, 1817) – Costa Rica through northern, central South America
- P. c. peruviana Chapman, 1922 – western Peru
- P. c. patagonica (d'Orbigny & Lafresnaye, 1837) – southern South America

== Description ==
The adult blue-and-white swallow averages 11–12 cm (4.3–4.7 in) long and weighs about 10 g (0.35 oz). It has dark blue upperparts and white underparts, and its underwings and the undersurface of its short forked tail are blackish. The juvenile is brown above, buff-tinted below, and has a less forked tail. The call is a buzzing dzzzhreeee.

There are three subspecies. The nominate N. c. cyanoleuca occurs from Nicaragua and Trinidad south to northwestern Argentina, Paraguay and Uruguay. The migratory southern race N. c. patagonica is larger, 13.5 cm (5.3 in), has paler underwings, and white basal undertail coverts. N. c. peruviana is restricted to coastal Peru up to 2,500 m (8,200 ft) altitude. It is smaller than patagonica, has less white in the undertail, darker underwings and duskier flanks.

== Distribution and habitat ==
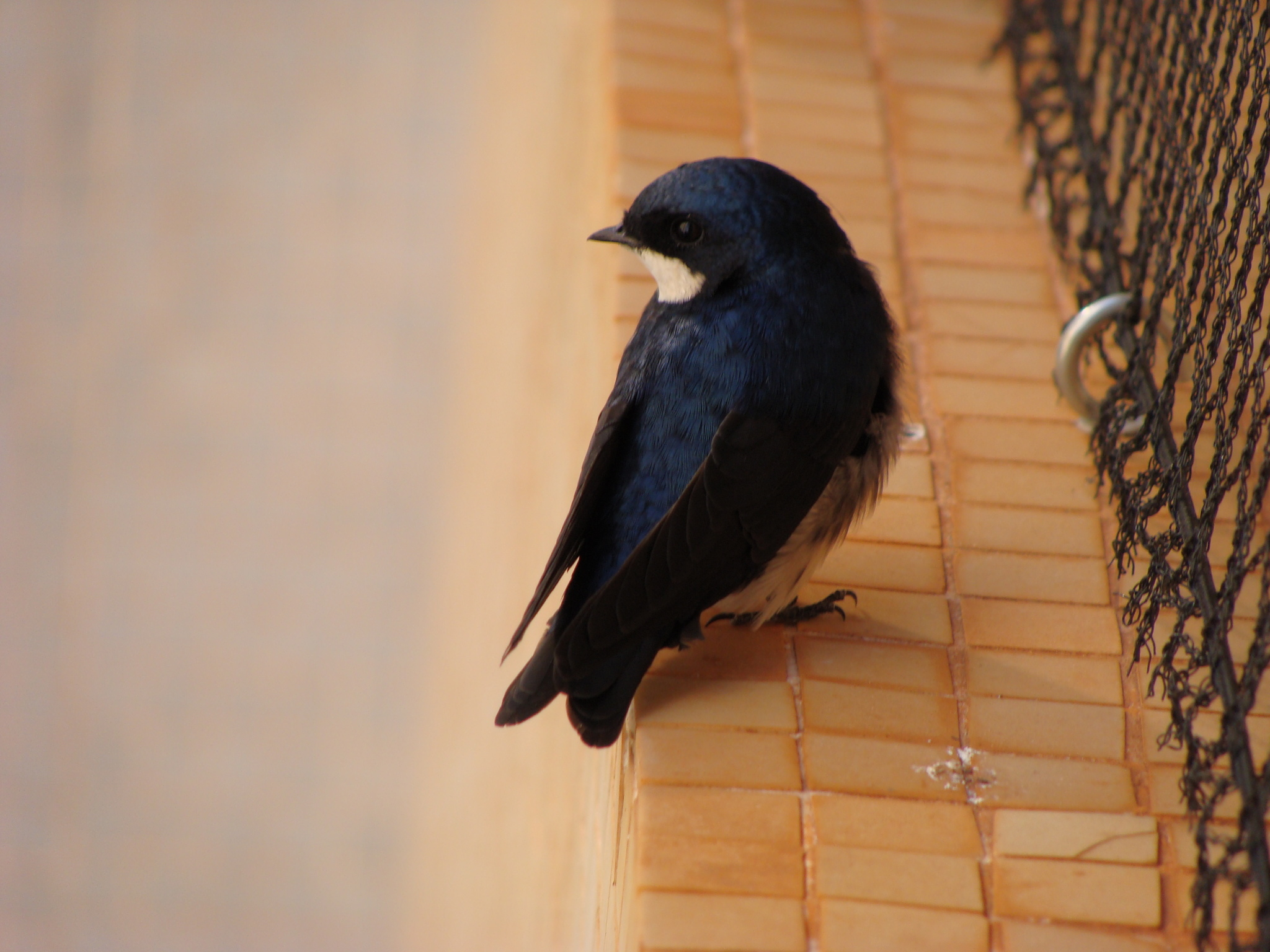
A blue-and-white swallow in an urban area in Brazil

This is a swallow of open areas including villages and towns, farms, and forest clearings. In Central America, it is a highland bird, but elsewhere in its range it can occur from the lowlands to an altitude of 4,000 m (13,000 ft).

== Behaviour and ecology ==
This species is often found in small flocks when not breeding. The blue-and-white swallow subsists primarily on a diet of insects, caught in the air; they have been seen to gather where termites swarm. The flight is typically fluttery, and this swallow frequently perches on wires or branches.

=== Breeding ===
The blue-and-white swallow's shallow straw nest is built by both adults in a wide range of natural or man-made cavities include tree holes, rock crevices and bridges. The clutch is up to six white eggs in the south of the range, two or three in the north, which are incubated by both parents for 15 days to hatching. The nestlings are fed by both parents for 26 days to fledging, but return to the nest to sleep with the parents for up to two months. There may be two broods.

== Status ==
This common and popular species has benefited greatly from deforestation and human settlement which have increased the amount of suitable habitat and food. Consequently, it is not considered threatened by the IUCN.
