= List of birds of Ohio =

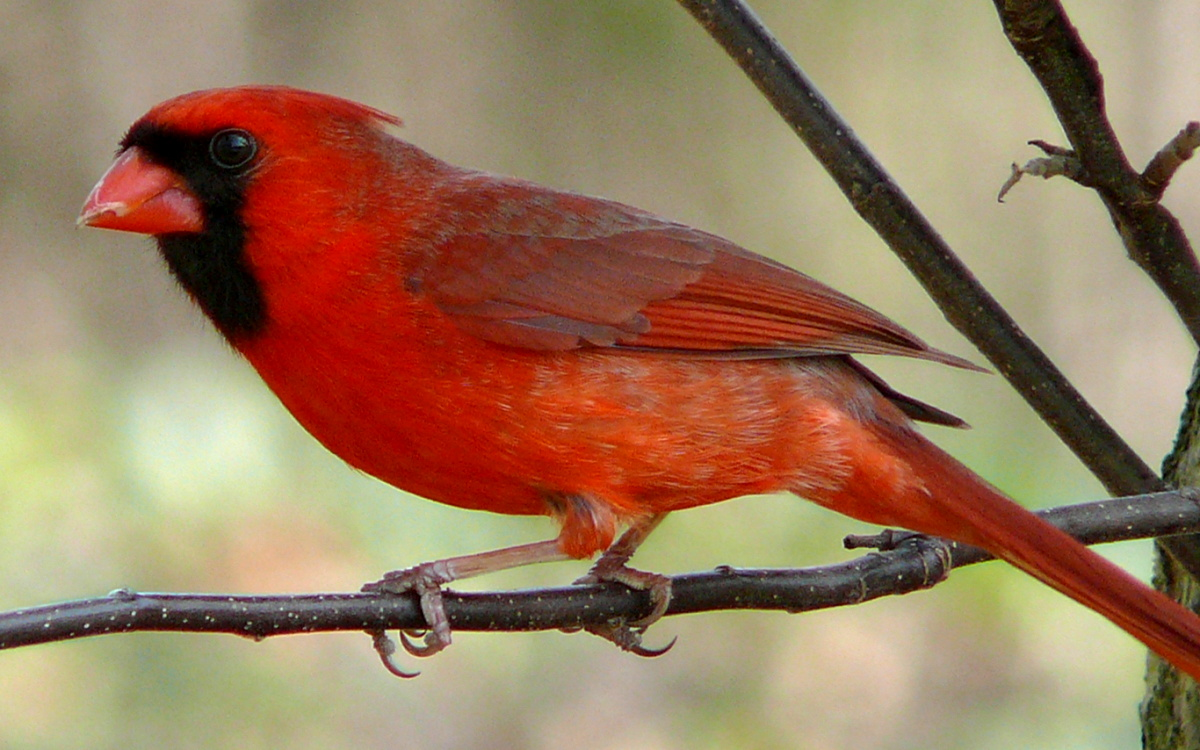
The northern cardinal is the state bird of Ohio.

This list of birds of Ohio includes species documented in the U.S. state of Ohio and accepted by Ohio Bird Records Committee (OBRC). As of July 2026, there were 456 species on the official list. Of them, 193 have been documented as breeding in the state, and 129 are review species as defined below. Eight species found in Ohio have been introduced to North America. Two species on the list are extinct, two more might be, and four have been extirpated. Birds that are considered probable escapees, although they may have been sighted flying free, are not included.

This list is presented in the taxonomic sequence of the Check-list of North and Middle American Birds, 7th edition through the 66th Supplement, published by the American Ornithological Society (AOS). Common and scientific names are also those of the Check-list, except that the common names of families are from the Clements taxonomy because the AOS list does not include them.

The following tags have been used to annotate some species:

- (B) Breeding - species having a confirmed nest in modern times
- (R) Review list - species which have rarely occurred in Ohio and whose sightings "must be acceptably documented before adding them to the official record" per the OBRC
- (I) Introduced - a species established solely as result of direct or indirect human intervention
- (E) Extinct - a recent species that no longer exists

== Ducks, geese, and waterfowl ==
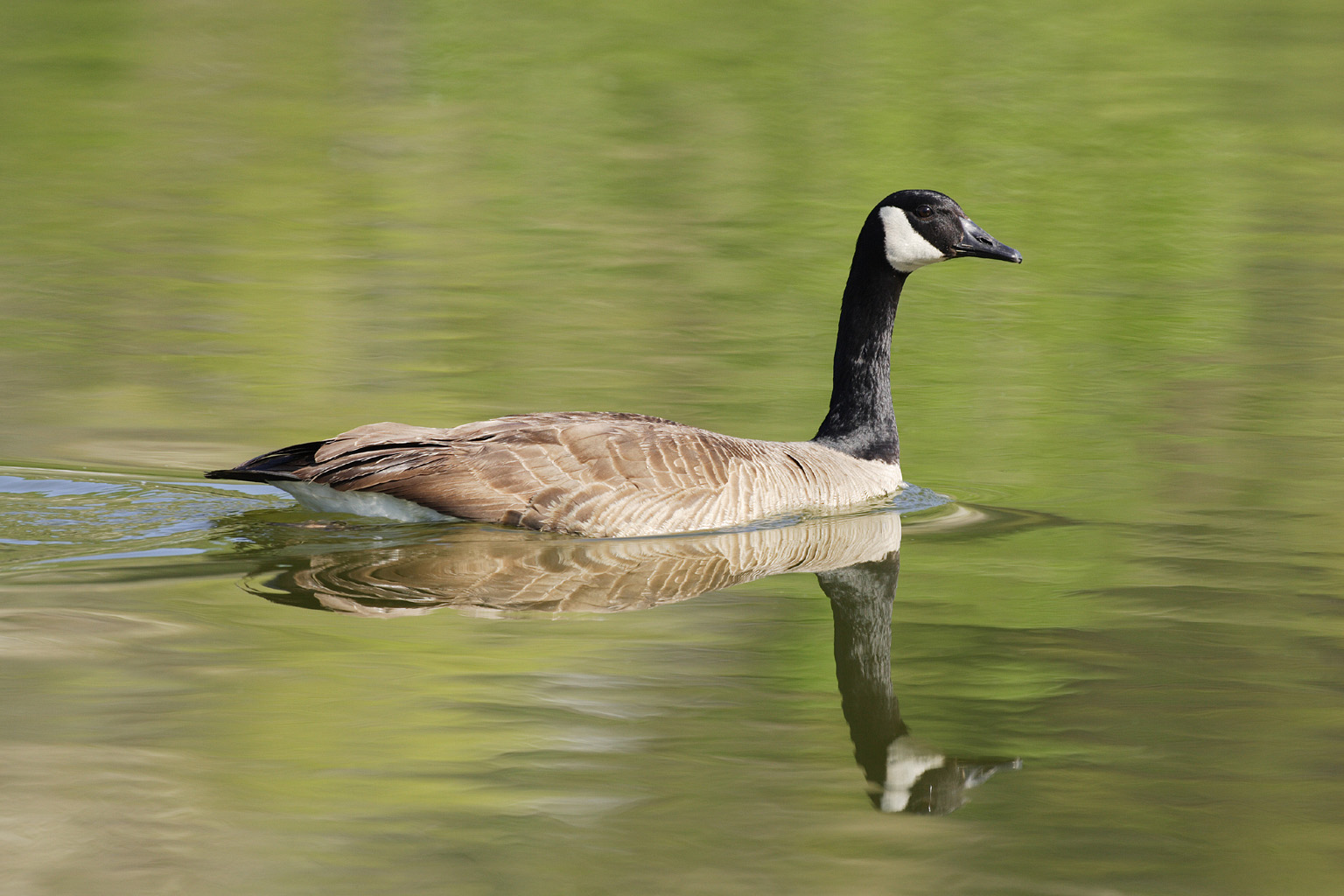
Canada goose

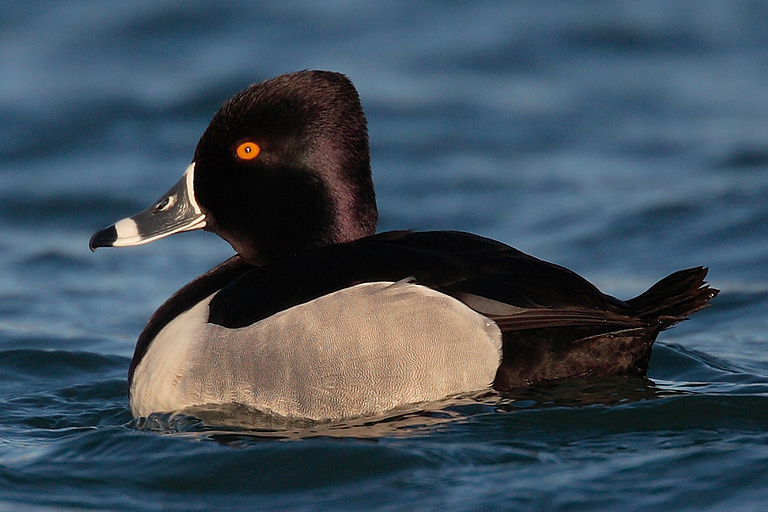
Ring-necked duck

Order: Anseriformes Family: Anatidae

The family Anatidae includes the ducks and most duck-like waterfowl, such as geese and swans. These birds are adapted to an aquatic existence with webbed feet, bills which are flattened to a greater or lesser extent, and feathers that are excellent at shedding water due to special oils. Forty-three species have been recorded in Ohio.

- Black-bellied whistling-duck, Dendrocygna autumnalis
- Fulvous whistling-duck, Dendrocygna bicolor (R)
- Snow goose, Anser caerulescens
- Ross's goose, Anser rossii
- Greater white-fronted goose, Anser albifrons
- Brant, Branta bernicla
- Cackling goose, Branta hutchinsii
- Canada goose, Branta canadensis (B)
- Mute swan, Cygnus olor (I) (B)
- Trumpeter swan, Cygnus buccinator (B)
- Tundra swan, Cygnus columbianus
- Wood duck, Aix sponsa (B)
- Garganey, Spatula querquedula (R)
- Blue-winged teal, Spatula discors (B)
- Cinnamon teal, Spatula cyanoptera (R)
- Northern shoveler, Spatula clypeata (B)
- Gadwall, Mareca strepera
- Eurasian wigeon, Mareca penelope
- American wigeon, Mareca americana
- Mallard, Anas platyrhynchos (B)
- American black duck, Anas rubripes
- Northern pintail, Anas acuta (B)
- Green-winged teal, Anas crecca (B)
- Canvasback, Aythya valisineria (B)
- Redhead, Aythya americana (B)
- Ring-necked duck, Aythya collaris
- Tufted duck, Aythya fuligula (R)
- Greater scaup, Aythya marila
- Lesser scaup, Aythya affinis (B)
- King eider, Somateria spectabilis (R)
- Common eider, Somateria mollissima (R)
- Harlequin duck, Histrionicus histrionicus
- Surf scoter, Melanitta perspicillata
- White-winged scoter, Melanitta deglandi
- Black scoter, Melanitta americana
- Long-tailed duck, Clangula hyemalis
- Bufflehead, Bucephala albeola
- Common goldeneye, Bucephala clangula
- Barrow's goldeneye, Bucephala islandica (R)
- Hooded merganser, Lophodytes cucullatus (B)
- Common merganser, Mergus merganser (B)
- Red-breasted merganser, Mergus serrator
- Ruddy duck, Oxyura jamaicensis (B)

== New World quail ==
Order: Galliformes Family: Odontophoridae

The New World quails are small, plump terrestrial birds only distantly related to the quails of the Old World, but named for their similar appearance and habits. One species has been recorded in Ohio.

- Northern bobwhite, Colinus virginianus (B)

== Pheasants, grouse, and allies ==
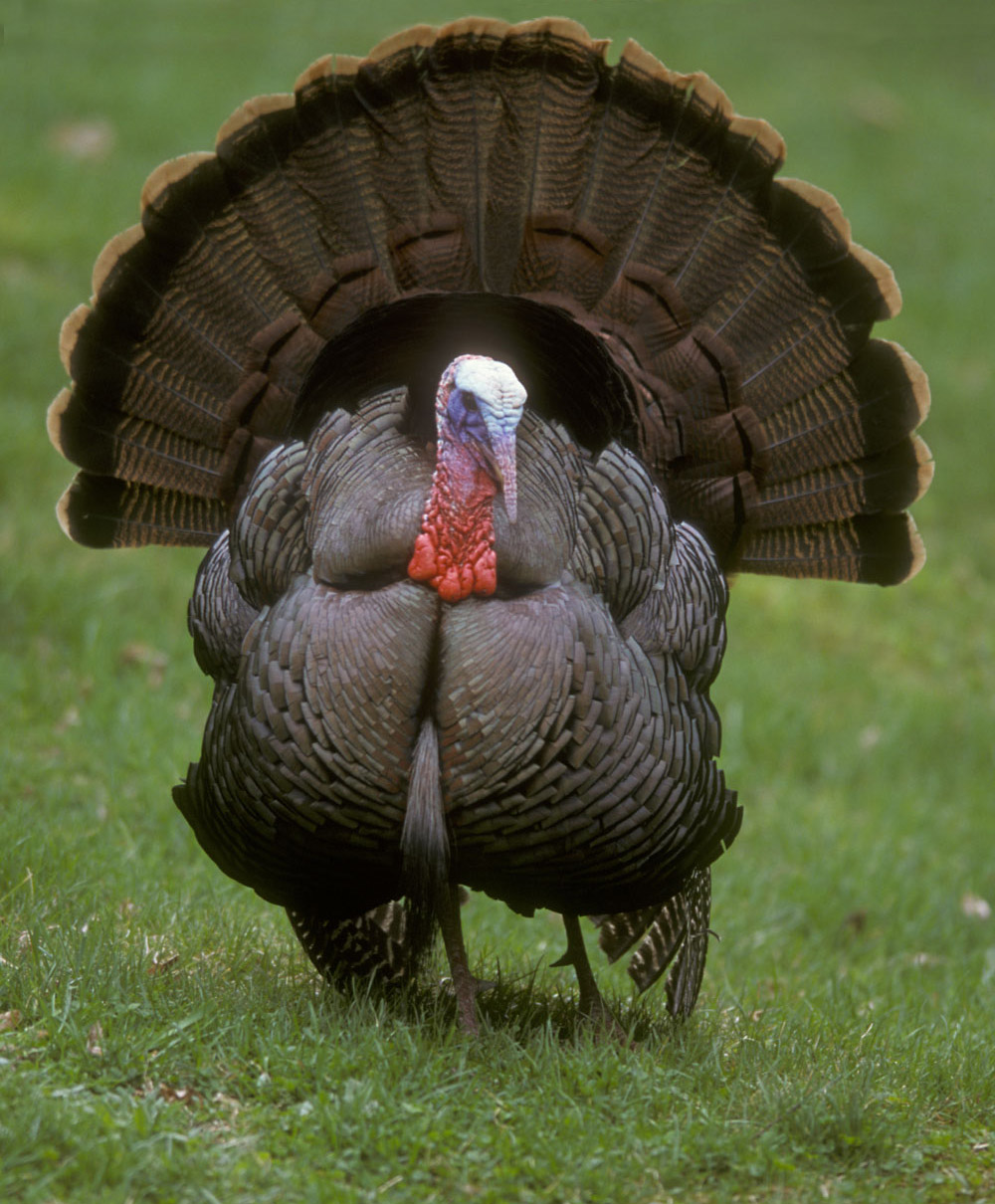
Wild turkey

Order: Galliformes Family: Phasianidae

Phasianidae consists of the pheasants and their allies. These are terrestrial species, variable in size but generally plump with broad relatively short wings. Many species are gamebirds or have been domesticated as a food source for humans. Five species have been recorded in Ohio.

- Wild turkey, Meleagris gallopavo (B)
- Ruffed grouse, Bonasa umbellus (B)
- Greater prairie-chicken, Tympanuchus cupido (extirpated)
- Gray partridge, Perdix perdix (I) (extirpated)
- Ring-necked pheasant, Phasianus colchicus (I) (B)

== Flamingoes ==
Order: Phoenicopteriformes Family: Phoenicopteridae

Flamingoes are gregarious wading birds, usually 3 to 5 feet (0.9 to 1.5 m) tall, found in both the Western and Eastern Hemispheres. Flamingos filter-feed on shellfish and algae. Their oddly shaped beaks are adapted to separate mud and silt from the food they consume and, uniquely, are used upside-down. One species has been recorded in Ohio.

- American flamingo, Phoenicopterus ruber (R)

== Grebes ==
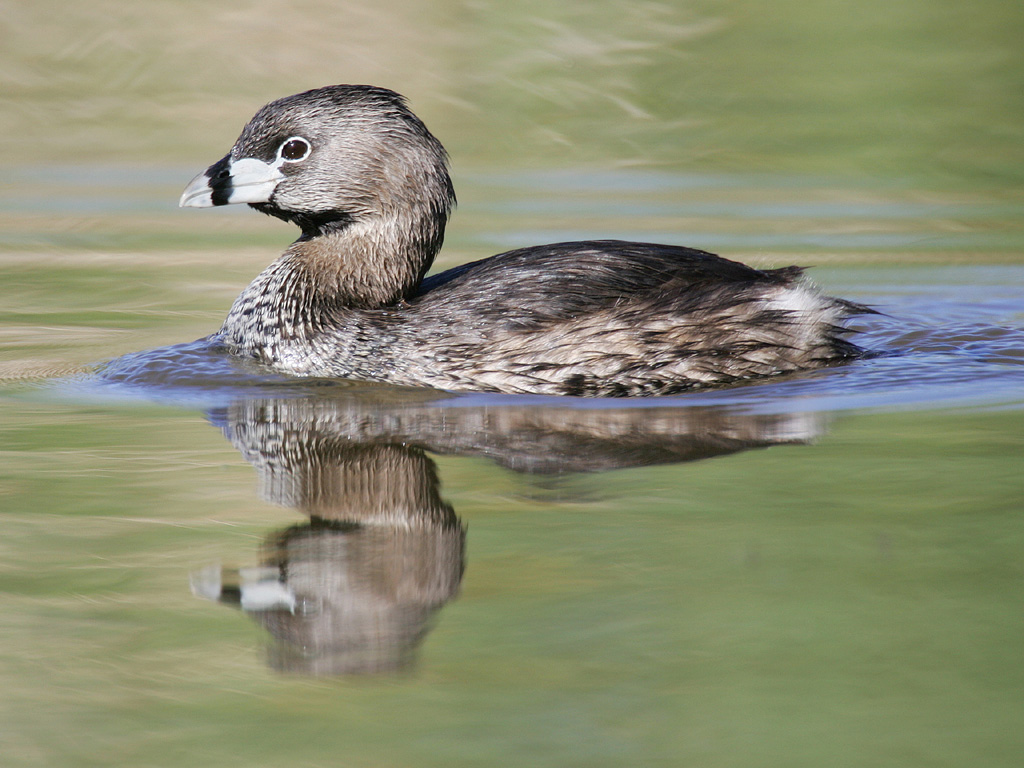
Pied-billed grebe

Order: Podicipediformes Family: Podicipedidae

Grebes are small to medium-large freshwater diving birds. They have lobed toes and are excellent swimmers and divers. However, they have their feet placed far back on the body, making them quite ungainly on land. Five species have been recorded in Ohio.

- Pied-billed grebe, Podilymbus podiceps (B)
- Horned grebe, Podiceps auritus
- Red-necked grebe, Podiceps grisegena
- Eared grebe, Podiceps nigricollis
- Western grebe, Aechmorphorus occidentalis (R)

== Pigeons and doves ==
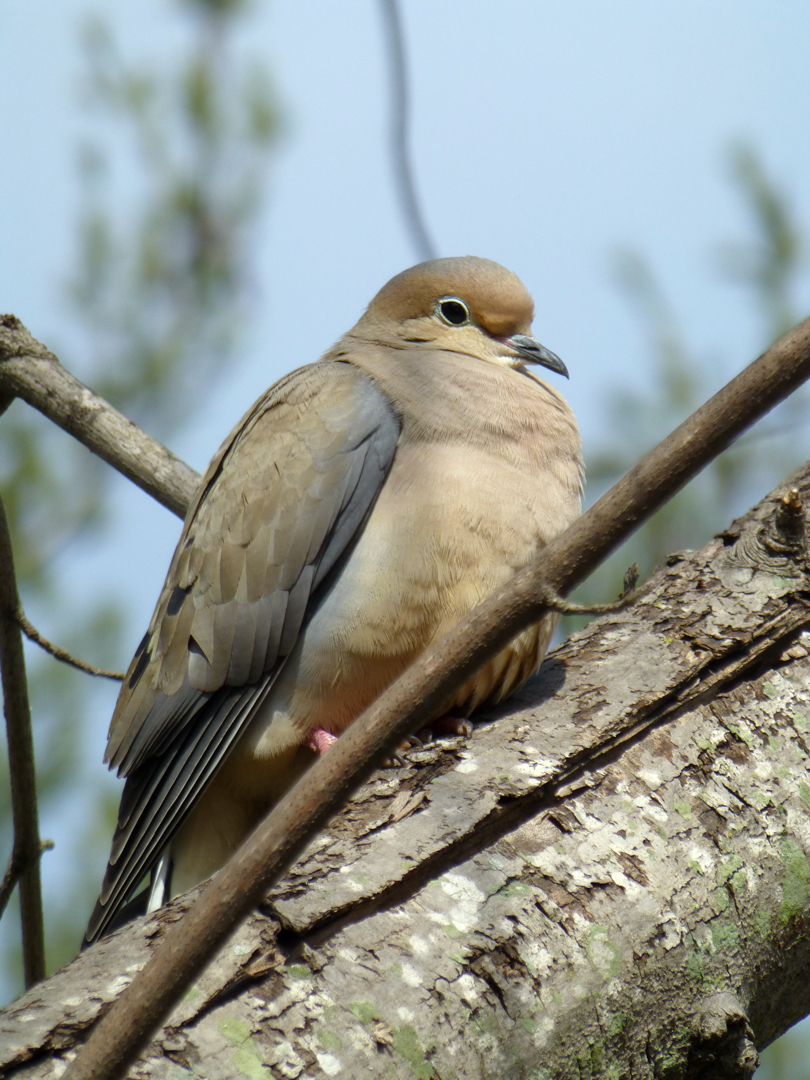
Mourning dove

Order: Columbiformes Family: Columbidae

Pigeons and doves are stout-bodied birds with short necks and short slender bills with a fleshy cere. Six species have been recorded in Ohio.

- Common ground dove, Columbina passerina (R)
- White-winged dove, Zenaida asiatica
- Mourning dove, Zenaida macroura (B)
- Passenger pigeon, Ectopistes migratorius (E)
- Eurasian collared-dove, Streptopelia decaocto (I)(B)
- Rock pigeon, Columba livia (I)(B)

== Cuckoos ==
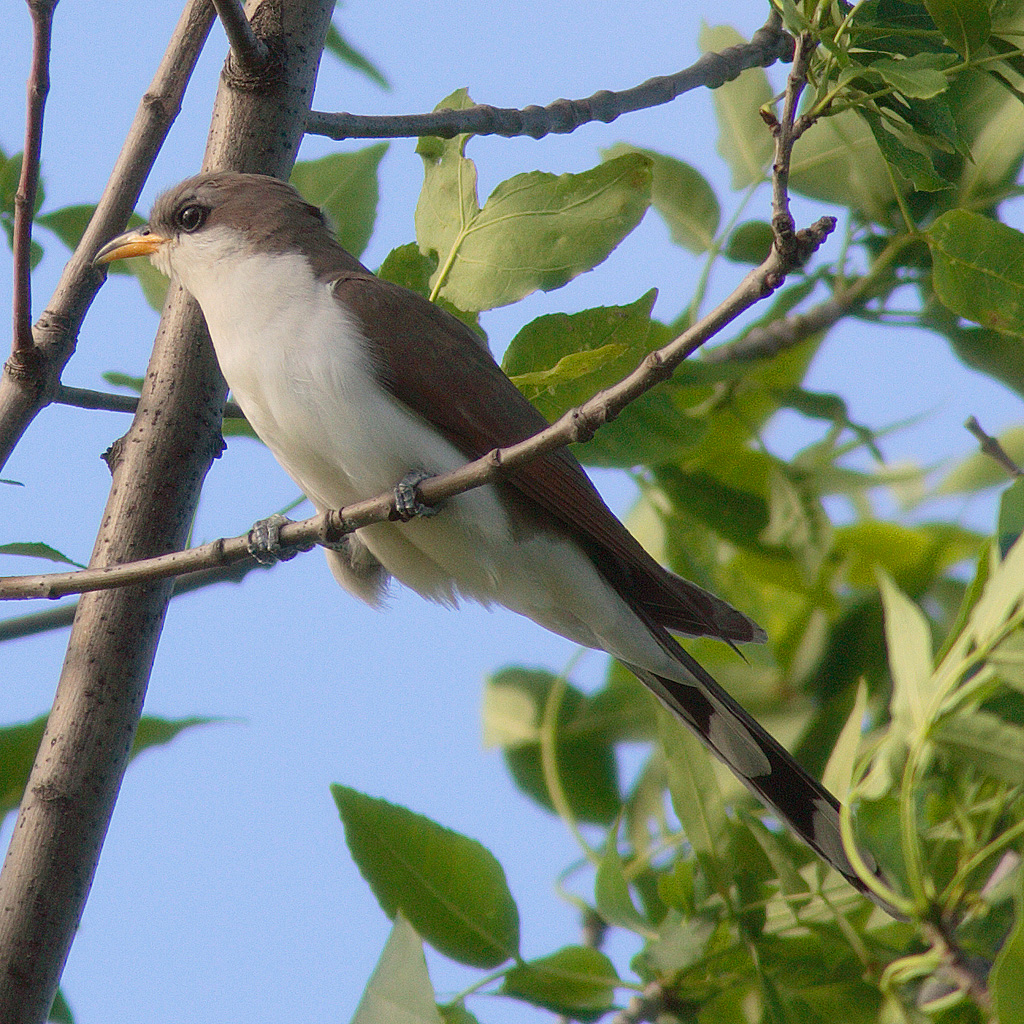
Yellow-billed cuckoo

Order: Cuculiformes Family: Cuculidae

The family Cuculidae includes cuckoos, roadrunners, and anis. These birds are of variable size with slender bodies, long tails, and strong legs. The Old World cuckoos are brood parasites. Four species have been recorded in Ohio.

- Smooth-billed ani, Crotophaga ani (R)
- Groove-billed ani, Crotophaga sulcirostris (R)
- Yellow-billed cuckoo, Coccyzus americanus (B)
- Black-billed cuckoo, Coccyzus erythropthalmus (B)

== Nightjars and allies ==
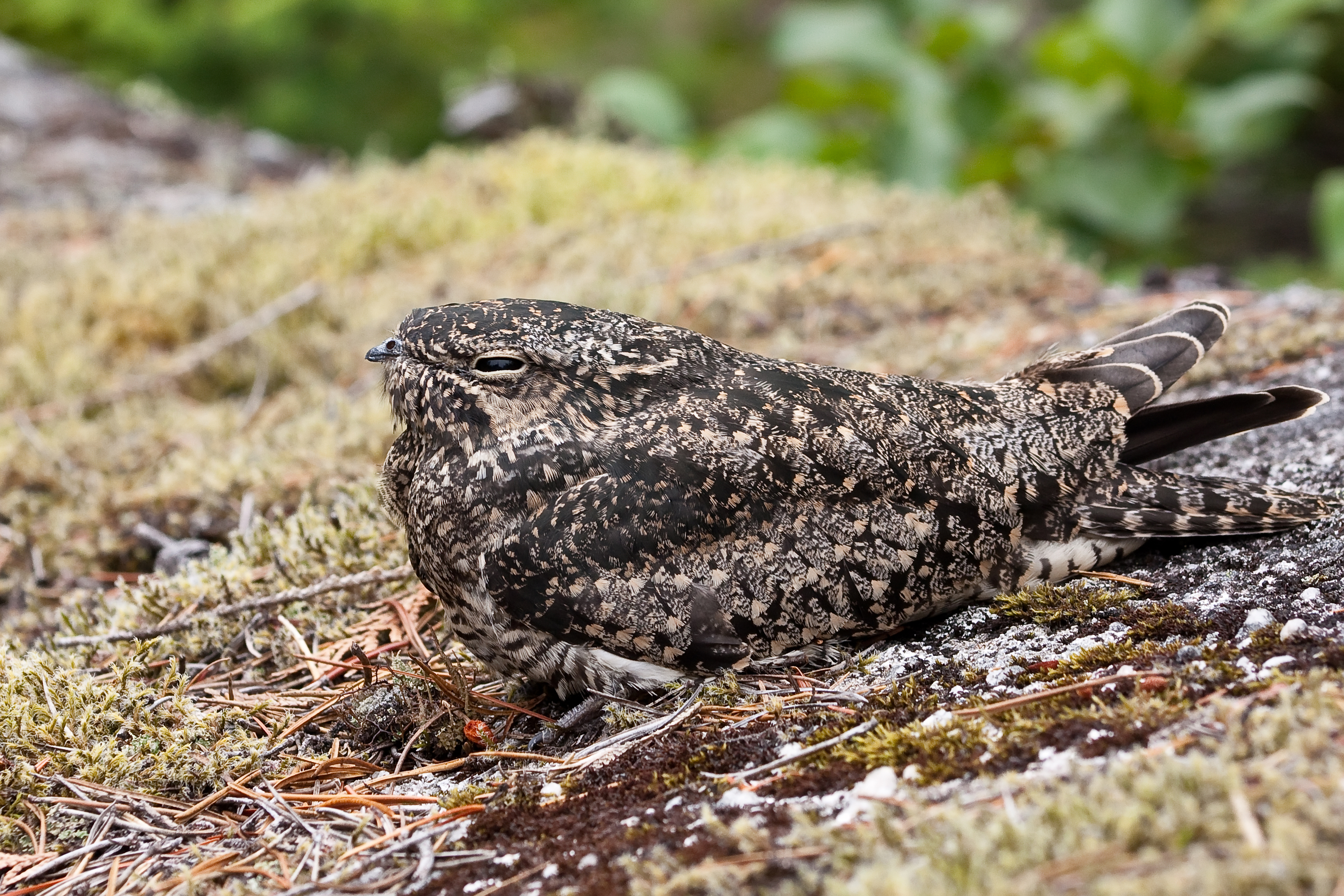
Common nighthawk

Order: Caprimulgiformes Family: Caprimulgidae

Nightjars are medium-sized nocturnal birds that usually nest on the ground. They have long wings, short legs, and very short bills. Most have small feet, of little use for walking, and long pointed wings. Their soft plumage is cryptically colored to resemble bark or leaves. Three species have been recorded in Ohio.

- Common nighthawk, Chordeiles minor (B)
- Chuck-will's-widow, Antrostomus carolinensis (B)
- Eastern whip-poor-will, Antrostomus vociferus (B)

== Swifts ==
Order: Apodiformes Family: Apodidae

The swifts are small birds which spend the majority of their lives flying. These birds have very short legs and never settle voluntarily on the ground, perching instead only on vertical surfaces. Many swifts have very long, swept-back wings which resemble a crescent or boomerang. Two species have been recorded in Ohio.

- Chimney swift, Chaetura pelagica (B)
- White-throated swift, Aeronautes saxatalis (R)

== Hummingbirds ==
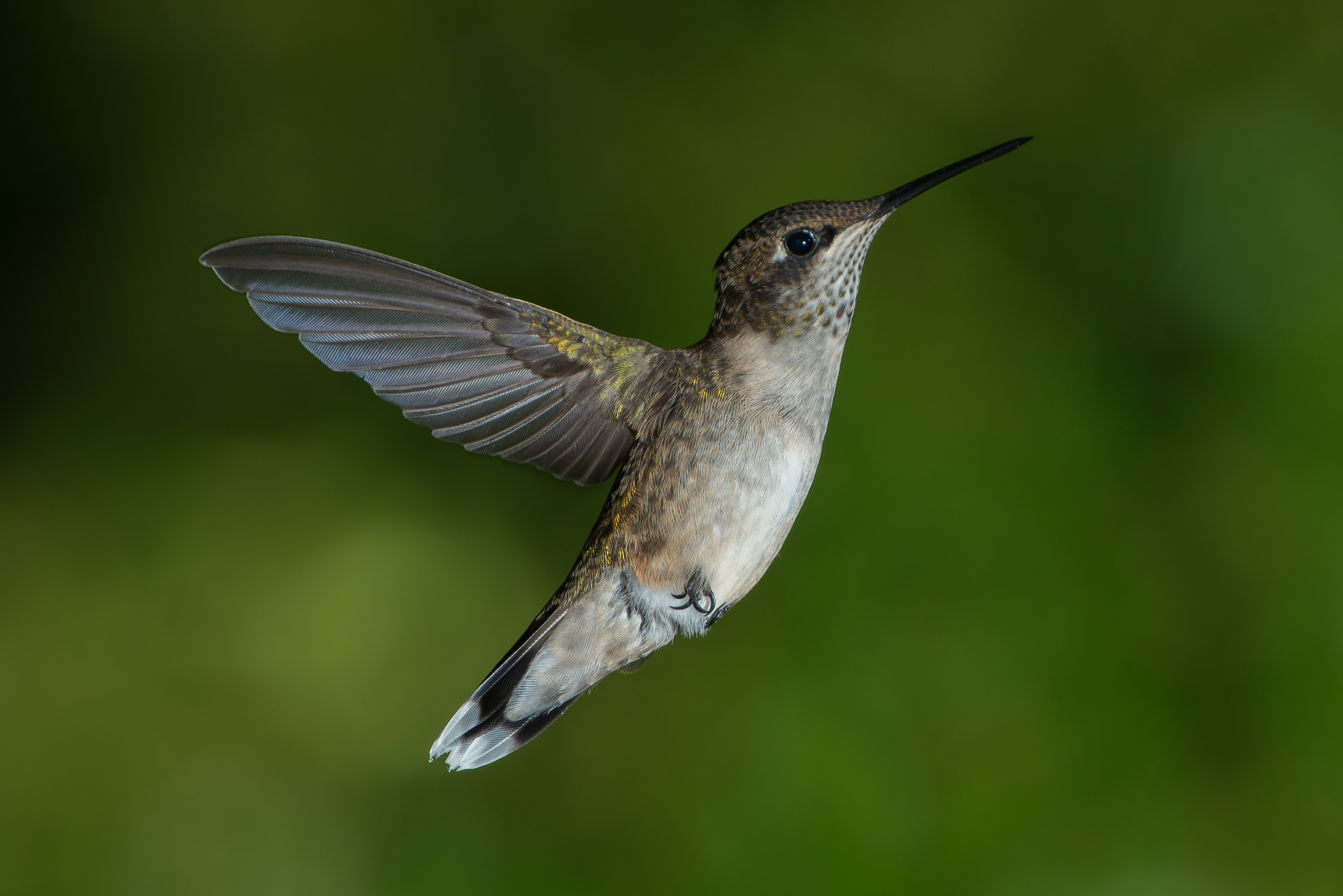
Ruby-throated hummingbird

Order: Apodiformes Family: Trochilidae

Hummingbirds are small birds capable of hovering in mid-air due to the rapid flapping of their wings. They are the only birds that can fly backwards. Eight species have been recorded in Ohio.

- Mexican violetear, Colibri thalassinus (R)
- Ruby-throated hummingbird, Archilochus colubris (B)
- Black-chinned hummingbird, Archilochus alexandri (R)
- Anna's hummingbird, Calypte anna (R)
- Calliope hummingbird, Selasphorus calliope (R)
- Rufous hummingbird, Selasphorus rufus
- Allen's hummingbird, Selasphorus sasin (R)
- Broad-billed hummingbird, Cynanthus latirostris (R)

== Limpkin ==
Order: Gruiformes Family: Aramidae

The limpkin is an odd bird that looks like a large rail, but is skeletally closer to the cranes. It is found in marshes with some trees or scrub in the Caribbean, South America, and southern Florida.

- Limpkin, Aramus guarauna (R)

== Cranes ==
Order: Gruiformes Family: Gruidae

Cranes are large, long-legged, and long-necked birds. Unlike the similar-looking but unrelated herons, cranes fly with necks outstretched, not pulled back. Most have elaborate and noisy courting displays or "dances". Two species have been recorded in Ohio.

- Sandhill crane, Antigone canadensis (B)
- Whooping crane, Grus americana (R)

== Rails, gallinules, and coots ==
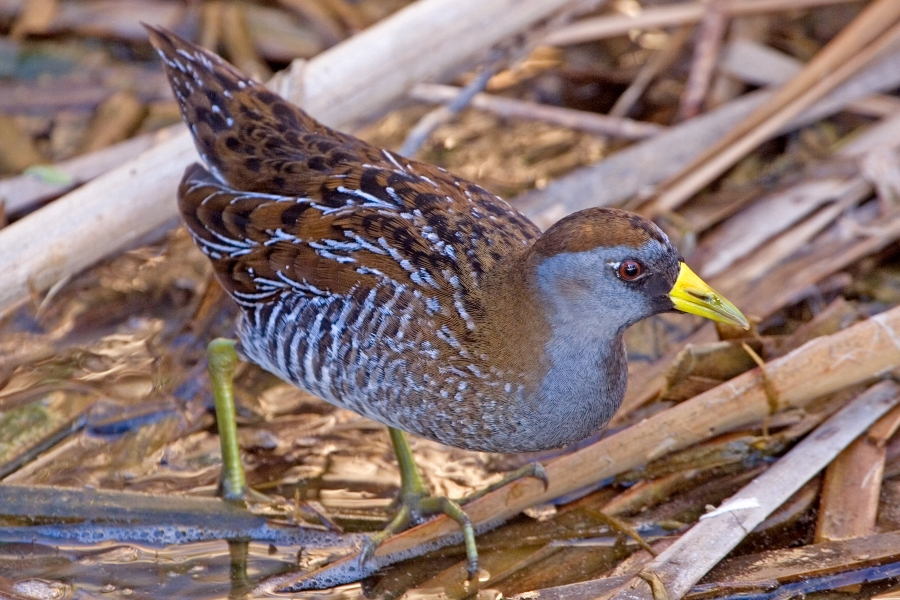
Sora

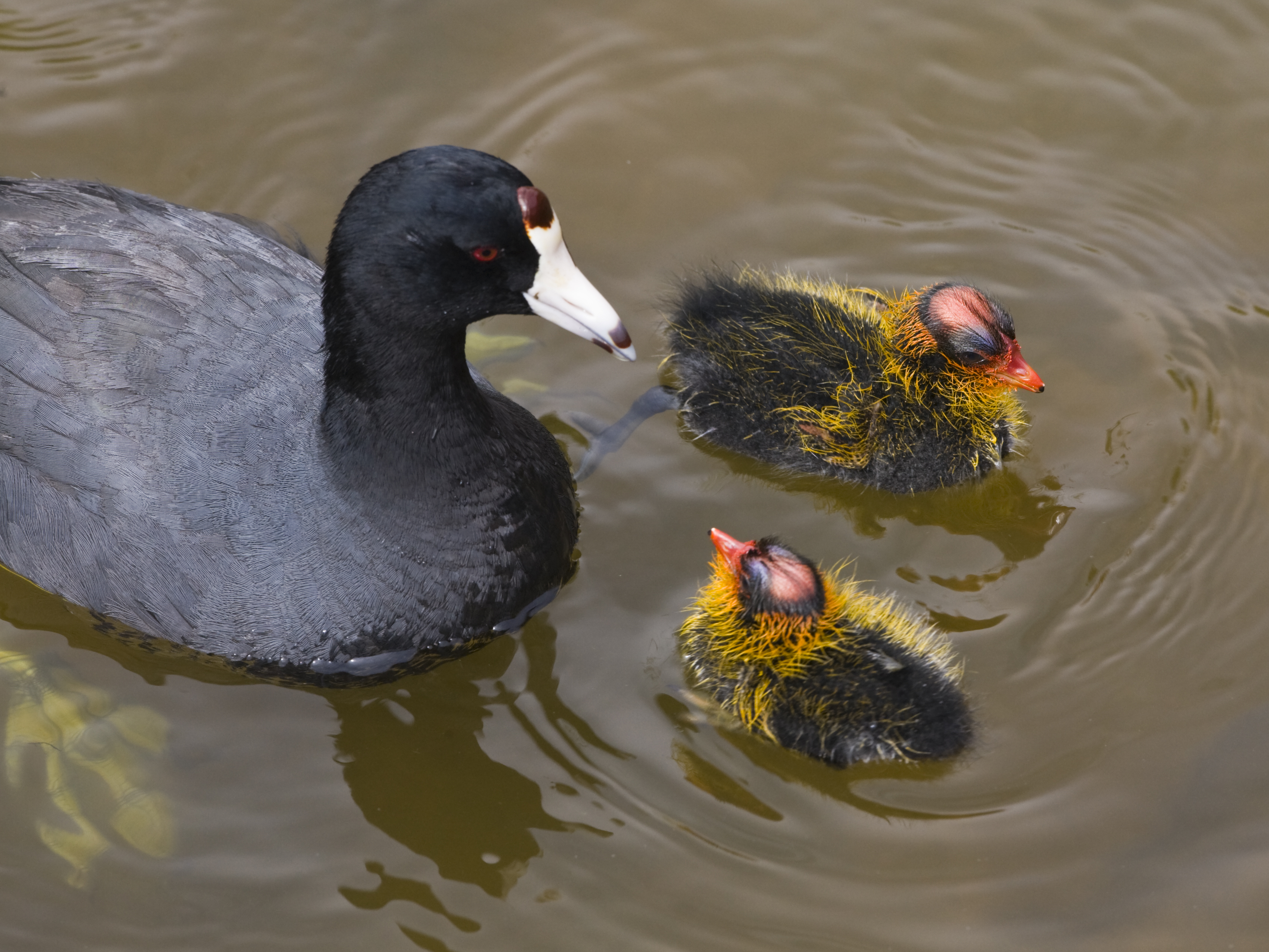
American coot

Order: Gruiformes Family: Rallidae

Rallidae is a large family of small to medium-sized birds which includes the rails, crakes, coots, and gallinules. The most typical family members occupy dense vegetation in damp environments near lakes, swamps, or rivers. In general they are shy and secretive birds, making them difficult to observe. Most species have strong legs and long toes which are well adapted to soft uneven surfaces. They tend to have short, rounded wings and tend to be weak fliers. Eight species have been recorded in Ohio.

- King rail, Rallus elegans (B)
- Virginia rail, Rallus limicola (B)
- Sora, Porzana carolina (B)
- Common gallinule, Gallinula galeata (B)
- American coot, Fulica americana (B)
- Purple gallinule, Porphyrio martinicus (B) (R)
- Yellow rail, Coturnicops noveboracensis
- Black rail, Laterallus jamaicensis (R)

== Stilts and avocets ==
Order: Charadriiformes Family: Recurvirostridae

Recurvirostridae is a family of large wading birds which includes the avocets and stilts. The avocets have long legs and long up-curved bills. The stilts have extremely long legs and long, thin, straight bills. Two species have been recorded in Ohio.

- Black-necked stilt, Himantopus mexicanus (B)
- American avocet, Recurvirostra americana

== Plovers and lapwings ==
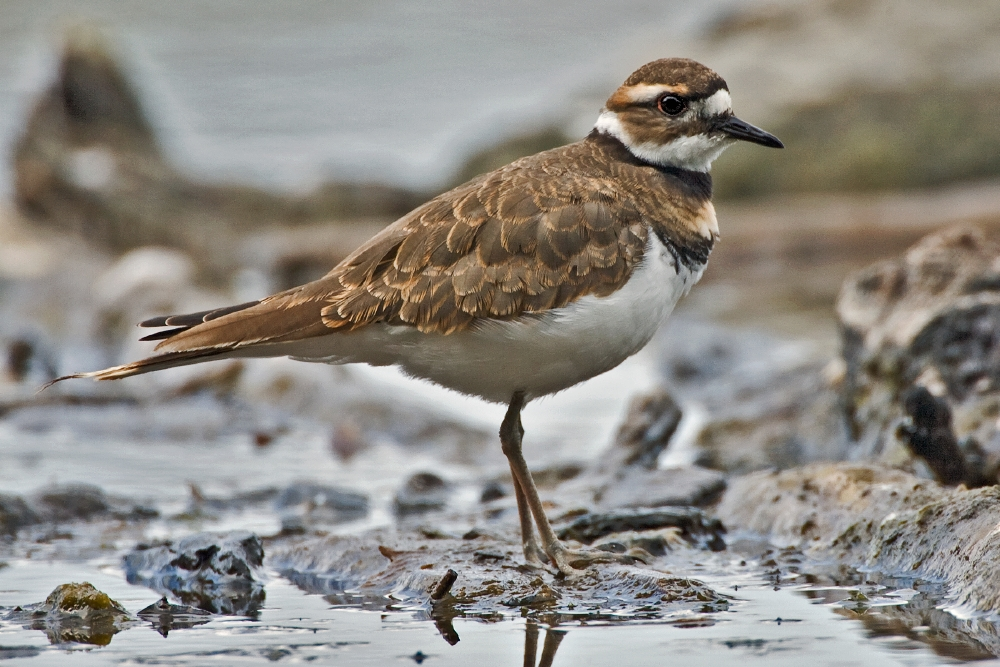
Killdeer

Order: Charadriiformes Family: Charadriidae

The family Charadriidae includes the plovers, dotterels, and lapwings. They are small to medium-sized birds with compact bodies, short thick necks, and long, usually pointed, wings. They are found in open country worldwide, mostly in habitats near water. Eight species have been recorded in Ohio.

- Black-bellied plover, Pluvialis squatarola
- American golden-plover, Pluvialis dominica
- Killdeer, Charadrius vociferus (B)
- Semipalmated plover, Charadrius semipalmatus
- Piping plover, Charadrius melodus
- Northern lapwing, Vanellus vanellus (R)
- Wilson's plover, Charadrius wilsonia (R)
- Snowy plover, Charadrius nivosus (R)

== Sandpipers and allies ==
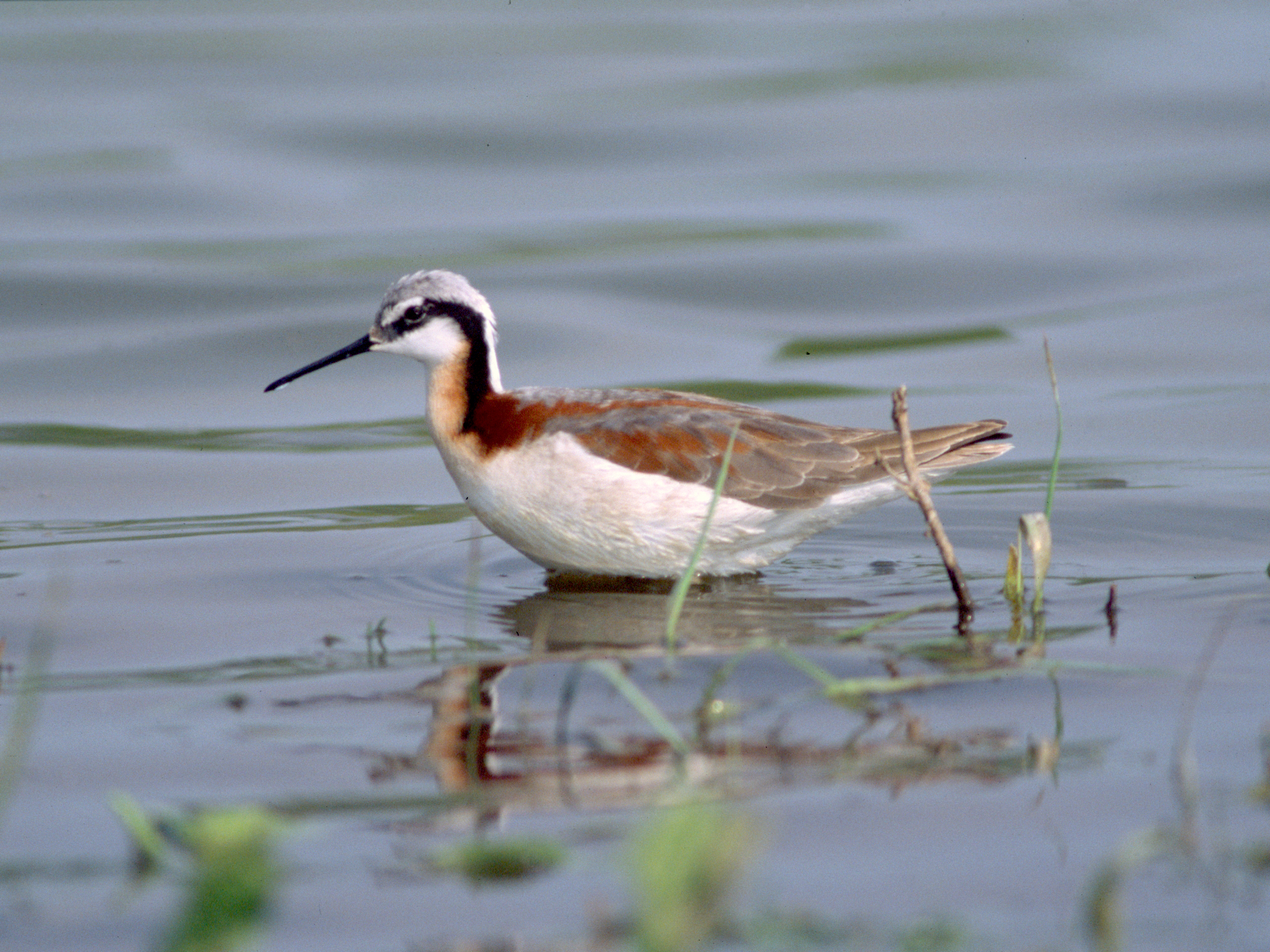
Wilson's phalarope

Order: Charadriiformes Family: Scolopacidae

Scolopacidae is a large diverse family of small to medium-sized shorebirds including the sandpipers, curlews, godwits, shanks, tattlers, woodcocks, snipes, dowitchers, and phalaropes. The majority of these species eat small invertebrates picked out of the mud or soil. Different lengths of legs and bills enable multiple species to feed in the same habitat, particularly on the coast, without direct competition for food. Thirty-eight species have been recorded in Ohio.

- Upland sandpiper, Bartramia longicauda (B)
- Whimbrel, Numenius phaeopus
- Eskimo curlew, Numenius borealis (E?) (R)
- Long-billed curlew, Numenius americanus (R)
- Hudsonian godwit, Limosa haemastica
- Marbled godwit, Limosa fedoa
- Ruddy turnstone, Arenaria interpres
- Red knot, Calidris canutus
- Ruff, Calidris pugnax
- Sharp-tailed sandpiper, Calidris acuminata (R)
- Stilt sandpiper, Calidris himantopus
- Curlew sandpiper, Calidris ferruginea (R)
- Red-necked stint, Calidris ruficollis (R)
- Sanderling, Calidris alba
- Dunlin, Calidris alpina
- Purple sandpiper, Calidris maritima
- Baird's sandpiper, Calidris bairdii
- Least sandpiper, Calidris minutilla
- White-rumped sandpiper, Calidris fuscicollis
- Buff-breasted sandpiper, Calidris subruficollis
- Pectoral sandpiper, Calidris melanotos
- Semipalmated sandpiper, Calidris pusilla
- Western sandpiper, Calidris mauri
- Short-billed dowitcher, Limnodromus griseus
- Long-billed dowitcher, Limnodromus scolopaceus
- Eurasian woodcock, Scolopax rusticola (R)
- American woodcock, Scolopax minor (B)
- Wilson's snipe, Gallinago delicata (B)
- Spotted sandpiper, Actitis macularia (B)
- Solitary sandpiper, Tringa solitaria
- Lesser yellowlegs, Tringa flavipes
- Willet, Tringa semipalmata
- Spotted redshank, Tringa erythropus (R)
- Greater yellowlegs, Tringa melanoleuca
- Marsh sandpiper, Tringa stagnatilis (R)
- Wilson's phalarope, Phalaropus tricolor (B)
- Red-necked phalarope, Phalaropus lobatus
- Red phalarope, Phalaropus fulicarius

== Skuas and jaegers ==
Order: Charadriiformes Family: Stercorariidae

Skuas and jaegers are in general medium to large birds, typically with gray or brown plumage, often with white markings on the wings. They have longish bills with hooked tips and webbed feet with sharp claws. They look like large dark gulls, but have a fleshy cere above the upper mandible. They are strong, acrobatic fliers. Three species have been recorded in Ohio.

- Pomarine jaeger, Stercorarius pomarinus
- Parasitic jaeger, Stercorarius parasiticus
- Long-tailed jaeger, Stercorarius longicaudus

== Auks, murres, and puffins ==
Order: Charadriiformes Family: Alcidae

The family Alcidae includes auks, murres, and puffins. These are short-winged birds that live on the open sea and normally only come ashore for breeding. Five species have been recorded in Ohio.

- Thick-billed murre, Uria lomvia (R)
- Black guillemot, Cepphus grylle (R)
- Long-billed murrelet, Brachyramphus perdix (R)
- Ancient murrelet, Synthliboarmphus antiquus (R)
- Atlantic puffin, Fratercula arctica (R)

== Gulls, terns and skimmers ==
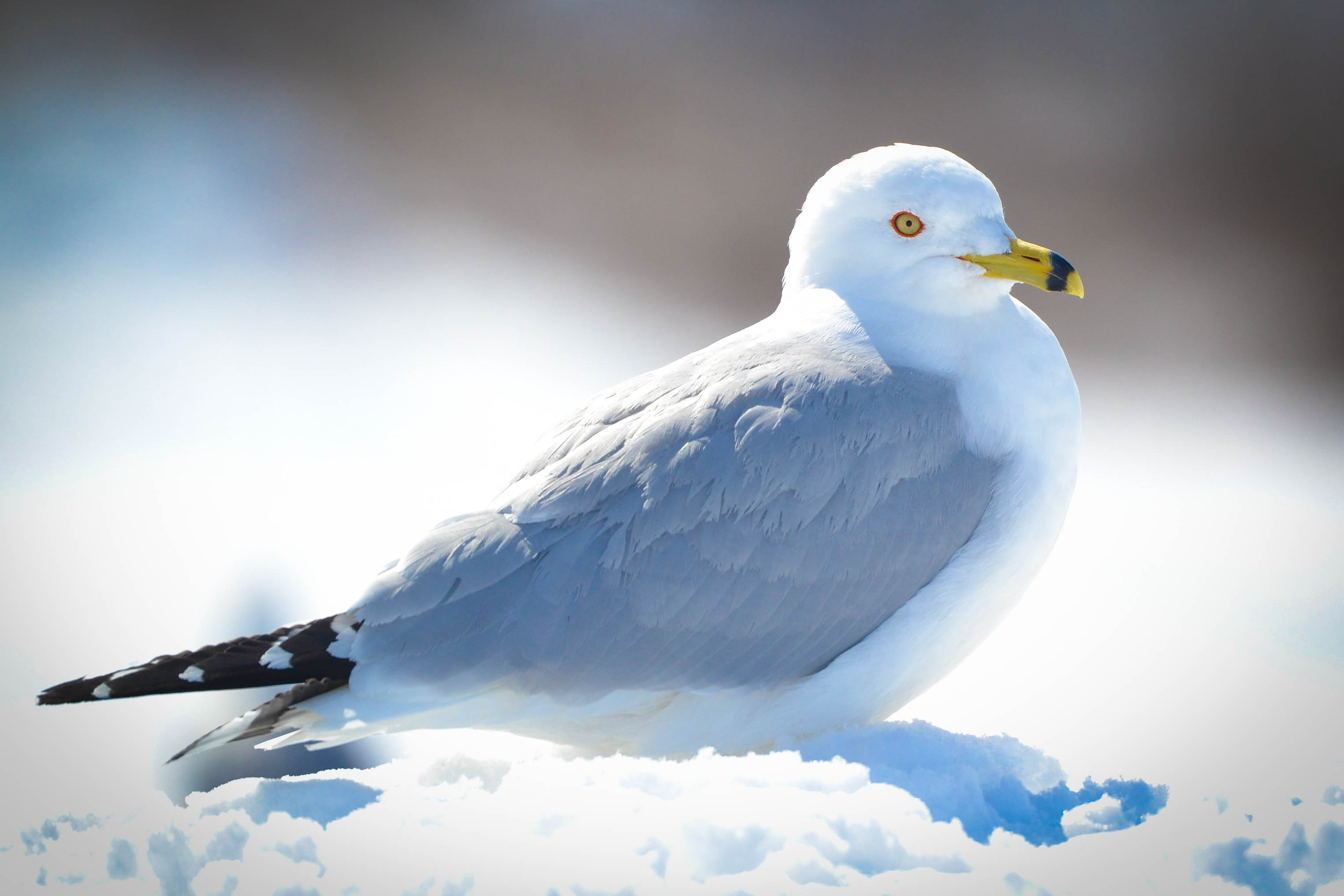
Ring-billed gull in Hamilton, Ohio

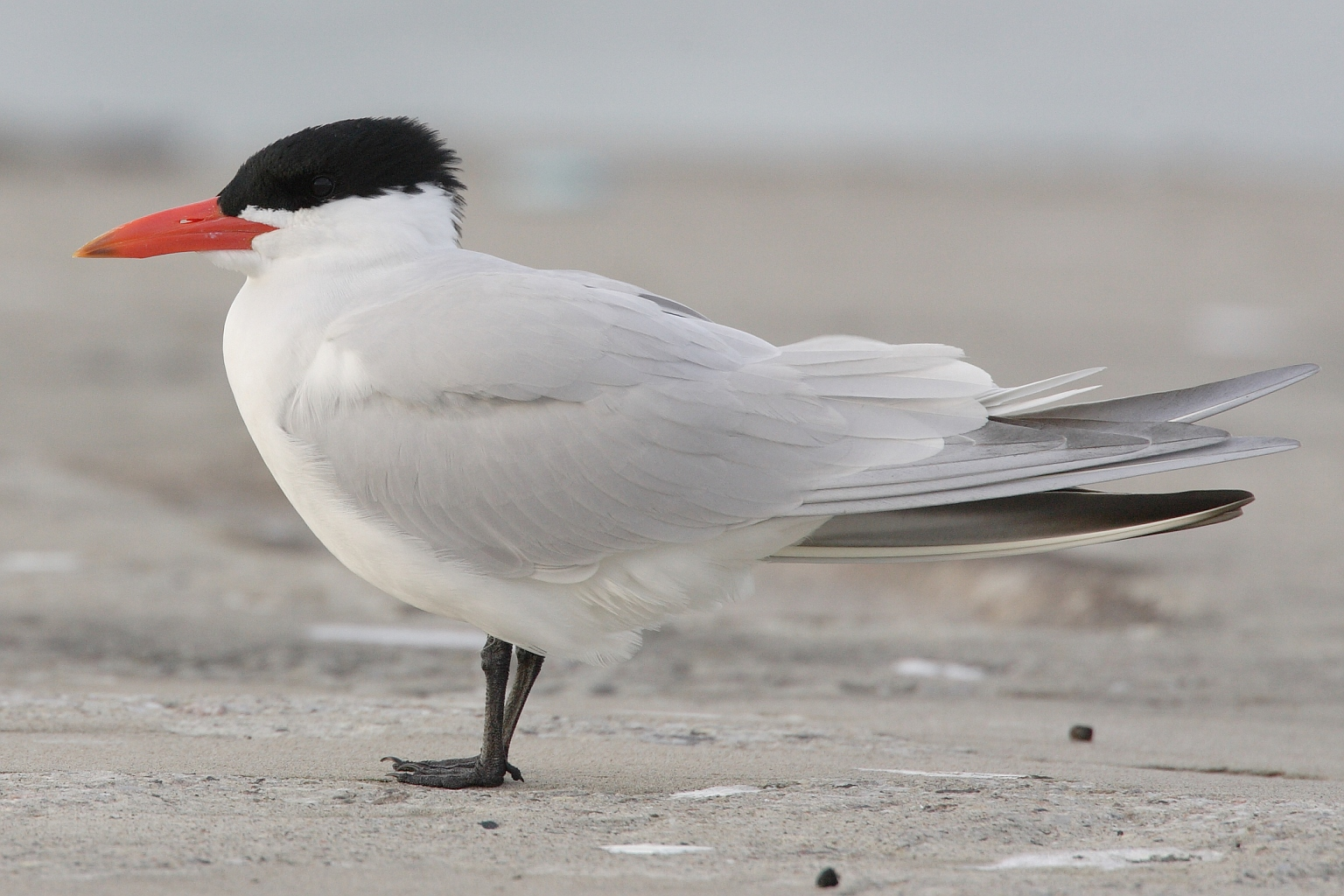
Caspian tern

Order: Charadriiformes Family: Laridae

Laridae is a family of medium to large seabirds and includes gulls, terns, kittiwakes, and skimmers. They are typically gray or white, often with black markings on the head or wings. They have stout, longish bills and webbed feet. Thirty-three species have been recorded in Ohio.

- Black-legged kittiwake, Rissa tridactyla
- Ivory gull, Pagophila eburnea (R)
- Sabine's gull, Xema sabini
- Bonaparte's gull, Chroicocephalus philadelphia
- Black-headed gull, Chroicocephalus ridibundus
- Little gull, Hydrocoleus minutus
- Ross's gull, Rhodostethia rosea (R)
- Laughing gull, Leucophaeus atricilla
- Franklin's gull, Leucophaeus pipixcan
- Black-tailed gull, Larus crassirostris (R)
- Heermann's gull, Larus heermanni (R)
- Common gull, Larus canus (R)
- Short-billed gull, Larus brachyrhynchus (R)
- Ring-billed gull, Larus delawarensis (B)
- California gull, Larus californicus
- Herring gull, Larus argentatus (B)
- Iceland gull, Larus glaucoides
- Lesser black-backed gull, Larus fuscus
- Slaty-backed gull, Larus schistisagus (R)
- Glaucous-winged gull, Larus glaucescens (R)
- Glaucous gull, Larus hyperboreus
- Great black-backed gull, Larus marinus
- Kelp gull, Larus dominicanus (R)
- Sooty tern, Onychoprion fuscatus (R)
- Least tern, Sternula antillarum
- Large-billed tern, Phaetusa simplex (R)
- Caspian tern, Hydroprogne caspia
- Black tern, Chlidonias niger (B)
- Roseate tern, Sterna dougalli (R)
- Common tern, Sterna hirundo (B)
- Arctic tern, Sterna paradisaea (R)
- Forster's tern, Sterna forsteri
- Royal tern, Thalasseus maximus (R)

== Loons ==
Order: Gaviiformes Family: Gaviidae

Loons are aquatic birds the size of a large duck, to which they are unrelated. Their plumage is largely gray or black, and they have spear-shaped bills. Loons swim well and fly adequately, but are almost hopeless on land, because their legs are placed towards the rear of the body. Four species have been recorded in Ohio.

- Red-throated loon, Gavia stellata
- Arctic loon, Gavia arctica (R)
- Pacific loon, Gavia pacifica
- Common loon, Gavia immer

== Northern storm-petrels ==
Order: Procellariiformes Family: Hydrobatidae

The storm-petrels are the smallest seabirds, relatives of the petrels, feeding on planktonic crustaceans and small fish picked from the surface, typically while hovering. The flight is fluttering and sometimes bat-like. One species has been recorded in Ohio.

- Leach's storm-petrel, Hydrobates leucorhous (R)

== Shearwaters and petrels ==
Order: Procellariiformes Family: Procellariidae

The procellariids are the main group of medium-sized "true petrels", characterized by united nostrils with medium septum and a long outer functional primary. One species has been recorded in Ohio.

- Black-capped petrel, Pterodroma hasitata (R)

== Storks ==
Order: Ciconiiformes Family: Ciconiidae

Storks are large, heavy, long-legged, long-necked wading birds with long stout bills and wide wingspans. They lack the powder down that other wading birds such as herons, spoonbills, and ibises use to clean off fish slime. Storks lack a pharynx and are mute. One species has been recorded in Ohio.

- Wood stork, Mycteria americana

== Frigatebirds ==
Order: Suliformes Family: Fregatidae

Frigatebirds are large seabirds usually found over tropical oceans. They are large, black, or black-and-white, with long wings and deeply forked tails. The males have colored inflatable throat pouches. They do not swim or walk and cannot take off from a flat surface. Having the largest wingspan-to-body-weight ratio of any bird, they are essentially aerial, able to stay aloft for more than a week. Two species have been recorded in Ohio.

- Lesser frigatebird, Fregata ariel (R)
- Magnificent frigatebird, Fregata magnificens (R)

== Boobies and gannets ==
Order: Suliformes Family: Sulidae

The sulids comprise the gannets and boobies. Both groups are medium-large coastal seabirds that plunge-dive for fish. Two species have been recorded in Ohio.

- Brown booby, Sula leucogaster (R)
- Northern gannet, Morus bassanus (R)

== Anhingas ==
Order: Suliformes Family: Anhingidae

Anhingas are cormorant-like water birds with very long necks and long, straight beaks. They are fish eaters which often swim with only their neck above the water. One species has been recorded in Ohio.

- Anhinga, Anhinga anhinga (R)

== Cormorants and shags ==
Order: Suliformes Family: Phalacrocoracidae

Cormorants are medium-to-large aquatic birds, usually with mainly dark plumage and areas of colored skin on the face. The bill is long, thin, and sharply hooked. Their feet are four-toed and webbed. Three species have been recorded in Ohio.

- Great cormorant, Phalacrocorax carbo (R)
- Double-crested cormorant, Nannopterum auritum (B)
- Neotropic cormorant, Nannopterum brasilianum

== Ibises and spoonbills ==
Order: Pelecaniformes Family: Threskiornithidae

The family Threskiornithidae includes the ibises and spoonbills. They have long, broad wings. Their bodies tend to be elongated, the neck more so, with rather long legs. The bill is also long, decurved in the case of the ibises, straight and distinctively flattened in the spoonbills. Four species have been recorded in Ohio.

- White ibis, Eudocimus albus (R)
- Glossy ibis, Plegadis falcinellus
- White-faced ibis, Plegadis chihi
- Roseate spoonbill, Platalea ajaja (R)

== Pelicans ==
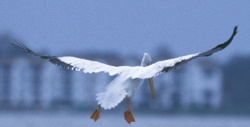
American white pelican

Order: Pelecaniformes Family: Pelecanidae

Pelicans are very large water birds with a distinctive pouch under their beak. Like other birds in the order Pelecaniformes, they have four webbed toes. Two species have been recorded in Ohio.

- American white pelican, Pelecanus erythrorhynchos
- Brown pelican, Pelecanus occidentalis

== Herons, egrets, and bitterns ==
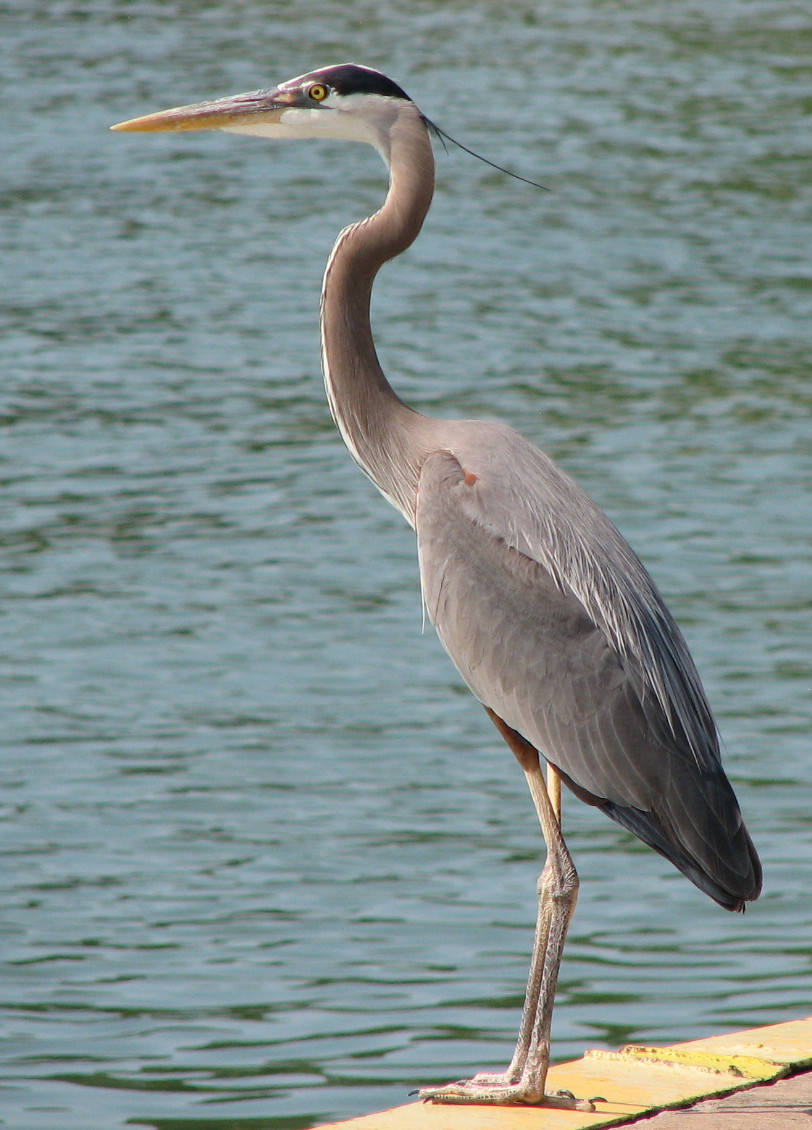
Great blue heron at Catawba Island State Park

Order: Pelecaniformes Family: Ardeidae

The family Ardeidae contains the herons, egrets, and bitterns. Herons and egrets are medium to large wading birds with long necks and legs. Bitterns tend to be shorter necked and more secretive. Members of Ardeidae fly with their necks retracted, unlike other long-necked birds such as storks, ibises, and spoonbills. Twelve species have been recorded in Ohio.

- Least bittern, Ixobrychus exilis (B)
- American bittern, Botaurus lentiginosus (B)
- Little blue heron, Egretta caerulea (B)
- Tricolored heron, Egretta tricolor (R)
- Reddish egret, Egretta rufescens (R)
- Snowy egret, Egretta thula (B)
- Yellow-crowned night heron, Nyctanassa violacea (B)
- Black-crowned night heron, Nycticorax nycticorax (B)
- Green heron, Butorides virescens (B)
- Great egret, Ardea alba (B)
- Western cattle-egret, Ardea ibis (B)
- Great blue heron, Ardea herodias (B)

== New World vultures ==
Order: Cathartiformes Family: Cathartidae

The New World vultures are not closely related to Old World vultures, but superficially resemble them because of convergent evolution. Like the Old World vultures, they are scavengers, however, unlike Old World vultures, which find carcasses by sight, New World vultures have a good sense of smell with which they locate carcasses. Two species have been recorded in Ohio.

- Black vulture, Coragyps atratus (B)
- Turkey vulture, Cathartes aura (B)

== Osprey ==
Order: Accipitriformes Family: Pandionidae

Pandionidae is a monotypic family of fish-eating birds of prey. Its single species possesses a very large and powerful hooked beak, strong legs, strong talons, and keen eyesight.

- Osprey, Pandion haliaetus (B)

== Hawks, eagles, and kites ==
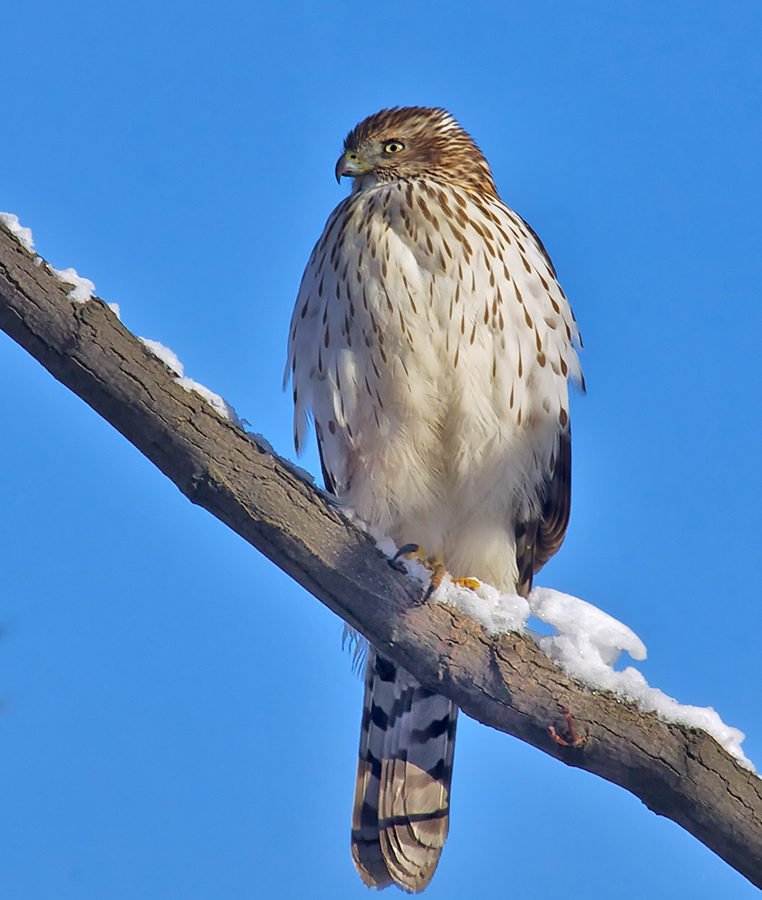
Cooper's hawk

Order: Accipitriformes Family: Accipitridae

Accipitridae is a family of birds of prey which includes hawks, eagles, kites, harriers, and Old World vultures. These birds have very large powerful hooked beaks for tearing flesh from their prey, strong legs, powerful talons, and keen eyesight. Sixteen species have been recorded in Ohio.

- White-tailed kite, Elanus leucurus (R)
- Swallow-tailed kite, Elanoides forficatus (extirpated)
- Golden eagle, Aquila chrysaetos
- Sharp-shinned hawk, Accipiter striatus (B)
- Cooper's hawk, Astur cooperii (B)
- American goshawk, Astur atricapillis (R)
- Northern harrier, Circus hudsonius (B)
- Bald eagle, Haliaeetus leucocephalus (B)
- Mississippi kite, Ictinia mississippiensis (B)
- Harris's hawk, Parabuteo unicinctus (R)
- Red-shouldered hawk, Buteo lineatus (B)
- Broad-winged hawk, Buteo platypterus (B)
- Swainson's hawk, Buteo swainsoni (R)
- Red-tailed hawk, Buteo jamaicensis (B)
- Rough-legged hawk, Buteo lagopus
- Ferruginous hawk, Buteo regalis (R)

== Barn-owls ==
Order: Strigiformes Family: Tytonidae

Barn-owls are medium to large owls with large heads and characteristic heart-shaped faces. They have long strong legs with powerful talons. One species has been recorded in Ohio.

- American barn owl, Tyto furcata (B)

== Owls ==
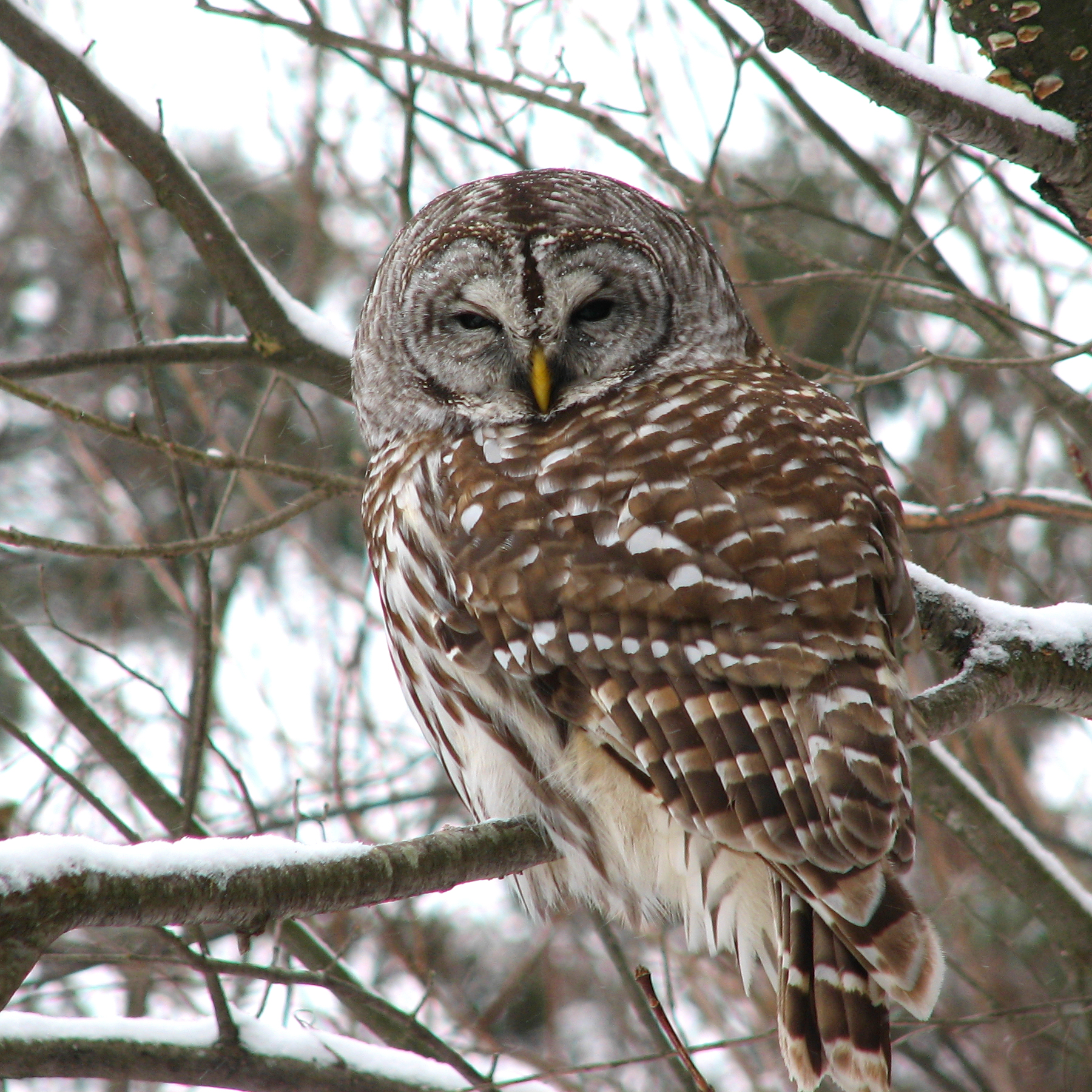
Barred owl

Order: Strigiformes Family: Strigidae

Typical owls are small to large solitary nocturnal birds of prey. They have large forward-facing eyes and ears, a hawk-like beak, and a conspicuous circle of feathers around each eye called a facial disk. Eleven species have been recorded in Ohio.

- Eastern screech-owl, Megascops asio (B)
- Great horned owl, Bubo virginianus (B)
- Snowy owl, Bubo scandiacus
- Northern hawk owl, Surnia ulula (R)
- Burrowing owl, Athene cunicularia (R)
- Barred owl, Strix varia (B)
- Great gray owl, Strix nebulosa (R)
- Long-eared owl, Asio otus
- Short-eared owl, Asio flammeus
- Boreal owl, Aegolius funereus (R)
- Northern saw-whet owl, Aegolius acadicus (B)

== Kingfishers ==
Order: Coraciiformes Family: Alcedinidae

Kingfishers are medium-sized birds with large heads, long, pointed bills, short legs, and stubby tails. One species has been recorded in Ohio.

- Belted kingfisher, Megaceryle alcyon (B)

== Woodpeckers ==
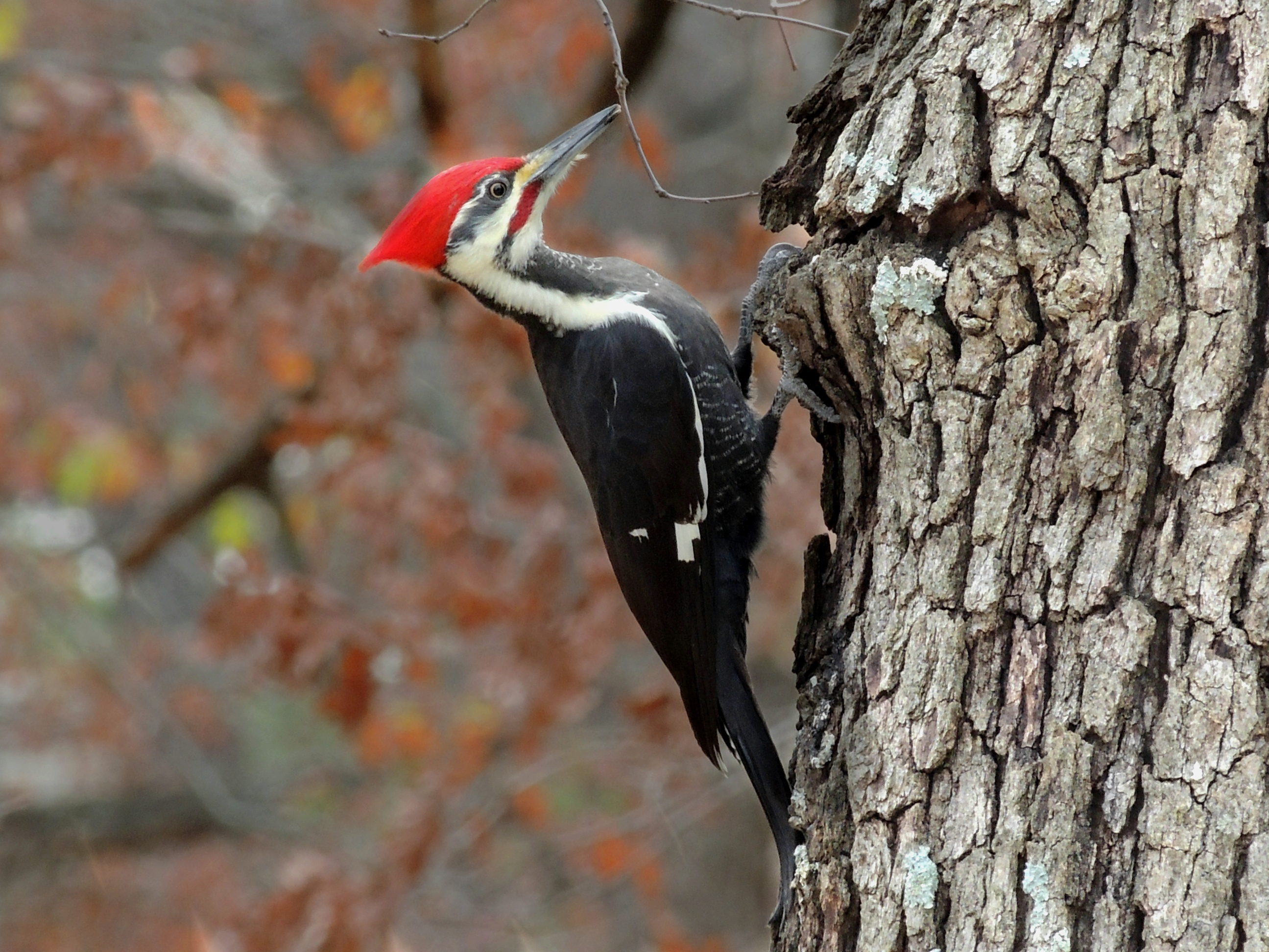
Pileated woodpecker

Order: Piciformes Family: Picidae

Woodpeckers are small to medium-sized birds with chisel-like beaks, short legs, stiff tails, and long tongues used for capturing insects. Some species have feet with two toes pointing forward and two backward, while several species have only three toes. Many woodpeckers have the habit of tapping noisily on tree trunks with their beaks. Eleven species have been recorded in Ohio.

- Red-headed woodpecker, Melanerpes erythrocephalus (B)
- Red-bellied woodpecker, Melanerpes carolinus (B)
- Yellow-bellied sapsucker, Sphyrapicus varius (B)
- Red-naped sapsucker, Sphyrapicus nuchalis (R)
- Black-backed woodpecker, Picoides arcticus (R)
- Downy woodpecker, Dryobates pubescens (B)
- Red-cockaded woodpecker, Dryobates borealis (R)
- Hairy woodpecker, Dryobates villosus (B)
- Northern flicker, Colaptes auratus (B)
- Pileated woodpecker, Dryocopus pileatus (B)
- Ivory-billed woodpecker, Campephilus principalis (E?)

== Falcons and caracaras ==
Order: Falconiformes Family: Falconidae

Falconidae is a family of diurnal birds of prey, notably the falcons and caracaras. They differ from hawks, eagles, and kites in that they kill with their beaks instead of their talons. Six species have been recorded in Ohio.

- Crested caracara, Caracara plancus (R)
- American kestrel, Falco sparverius (B)
- Merlin, Falco columbarius (B)
- Gyrfalcon, Falco rusticolus (R)
- Peregrine falcon, Falco peregrinus (B)
- Prairie falcon, Falco mexicanus (R)

== New World and African parrots ==
Order: Psittaciformes Family: Psittacidae

Characteristic features of parrots include a strong, curved bill, an upright stance, strong legs, and clawed zygodactyl feet. Many parrots are vividly colored, and some are multi-colored. In size they range from 8 cm (3.1 in) to 1 m (3.3 ft) in length. Most of the more than 150 species in the family are found in the New World. One species has been recorded in Ohio.

- Carolina parakeet, Conuropsis carolinensis (E)

== Tyrant flycatchers ==
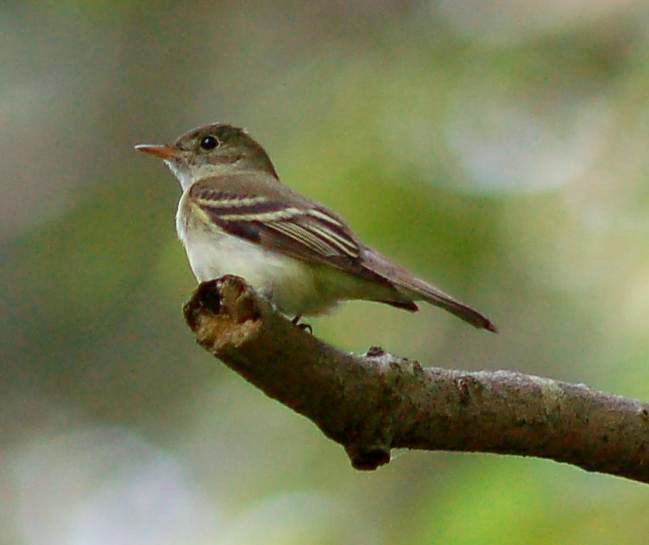
Acadian flycatcher

Order: Passeriformes Family: Tyrannidae

Tyrant flycatchers are Passerine birds which occur throughout North and South America. They superficially resemble the Old World flycatchers, but are more robust and have stronger bills. They do not have the sophisticated vocal capabilities of the songbirds. Most, but not all, are rather plain. As the name implies, most are insectivorous. Twenty species have been recorded in Ohio.

- Ash-throated flycatcher, Myiarchus ceneracens (R)
- Great crested flycatcher, Myiarchus crinitus (B)
- Tropical kingbird, Tyrannus melancholicus (R)
- Western kingbird, Tyrannus verticalis
- Eastern kingbird, Tyrannus tyrannus (B)
- Gray kingbird, Tyrannus dominicensis (R)
- Scissor-tailed flycatcher, Tyrannus forficatus (R)
- Olive-sided flycatcher, Contopus cooperi
- Eastern wood-pewee, Contopus virens (B)
- Yellow-bellied flycatcher, Empidonax flaviventris
- Acadian flycatcher, Empidonax virescens (B)
- Alder flycatcher, Empidonax alnorum (B)
- Willow flycatcher, Empidonax traillii (B)
- Least flycatcher, Empidonax minimus (B)
- Gray flycatcher, Empidonax wrightii (R)
- Dusky flycatcher, Empidonax oberholseri (R)
- Western flycatcher, Empidonax difficilis (R)
- Eastern phoebe, Sayornis phoebe (B)
- Say's phoebe, Sayornis saya (R)
- Vermilion flycatcher, Pyrocephalus rubinus (R)

== Vireos, shrike-babblers, and erpornis ==
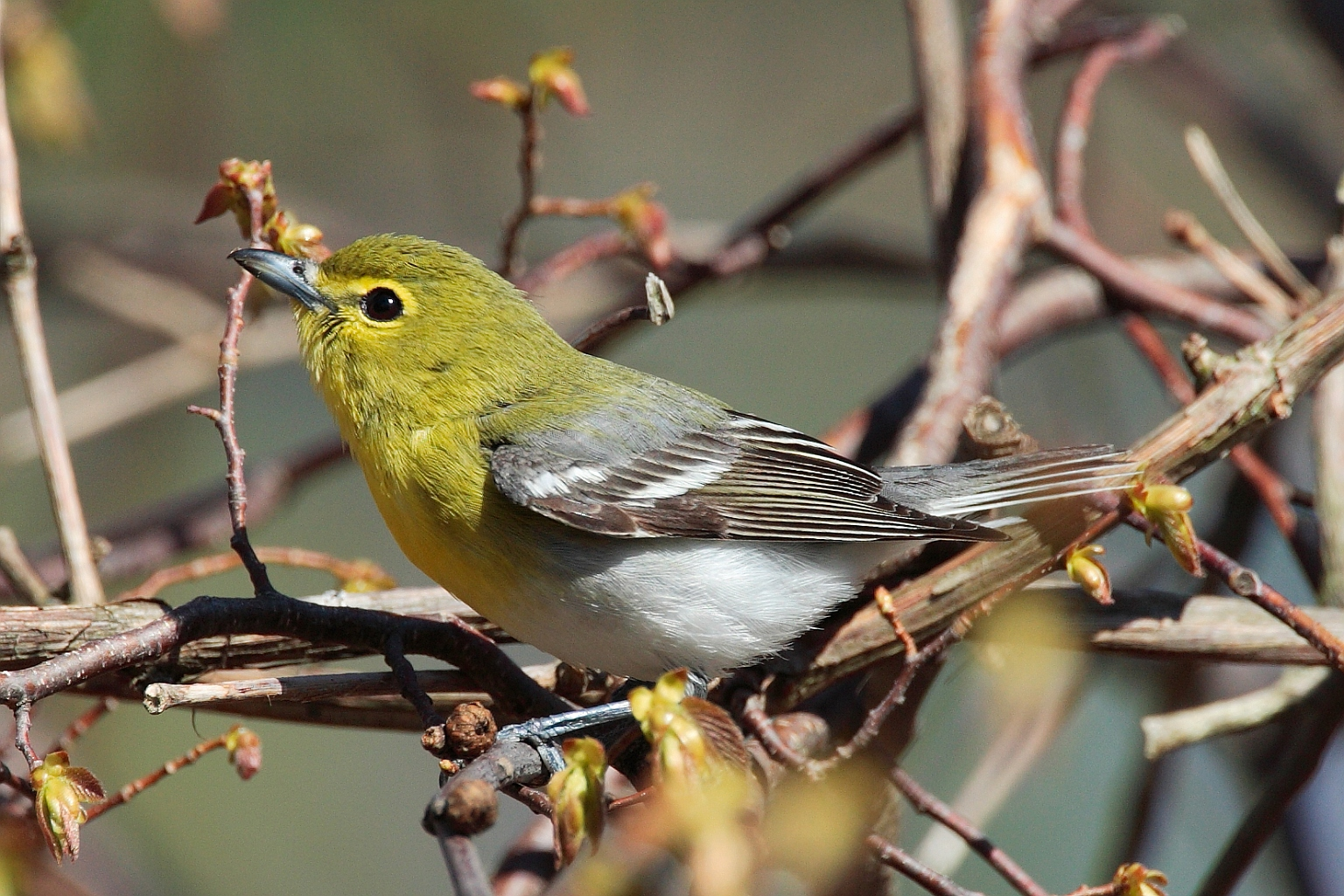
Yellow-throated vireo

Order: Passeriformes Family: Vireonidae

The vireos are a group of small to medium-sized passerine birds. They are typically greenish in color and resemble wood warblers apart from their heavier bills. Seven species have been recorded in Ohio.

- White-eyed vireo, Vireo griseus (B)
- Bell's vireo, Vireo bellii (B)
- Yellow-throated vireo, Vireo flavifrons (B)
- Blue-headed vireo, Vireo solitarius (B)
- Philadelphia vireo, Vireo philadelphicus
- Warbling vireo, Vireo gilvus (B)
- Red-eyed vireo, Vireo olivaceus (B)

== Shrikes ==
Order: Passeriformes Family: Laniidae

Shrikes are passerine birds known for their habit of catching other birds and small animals and impaling the uneaten portions of their bodies on thorns. A shrike's beak is hooked, like that of a typical bird of prey. Two species have been recorded in Ohio.

- Loggerhead shrike, Lanius ludovicianus (B) (R)
- Northern shrike, Lanius borealis

== Crows, jays, and magpies ==
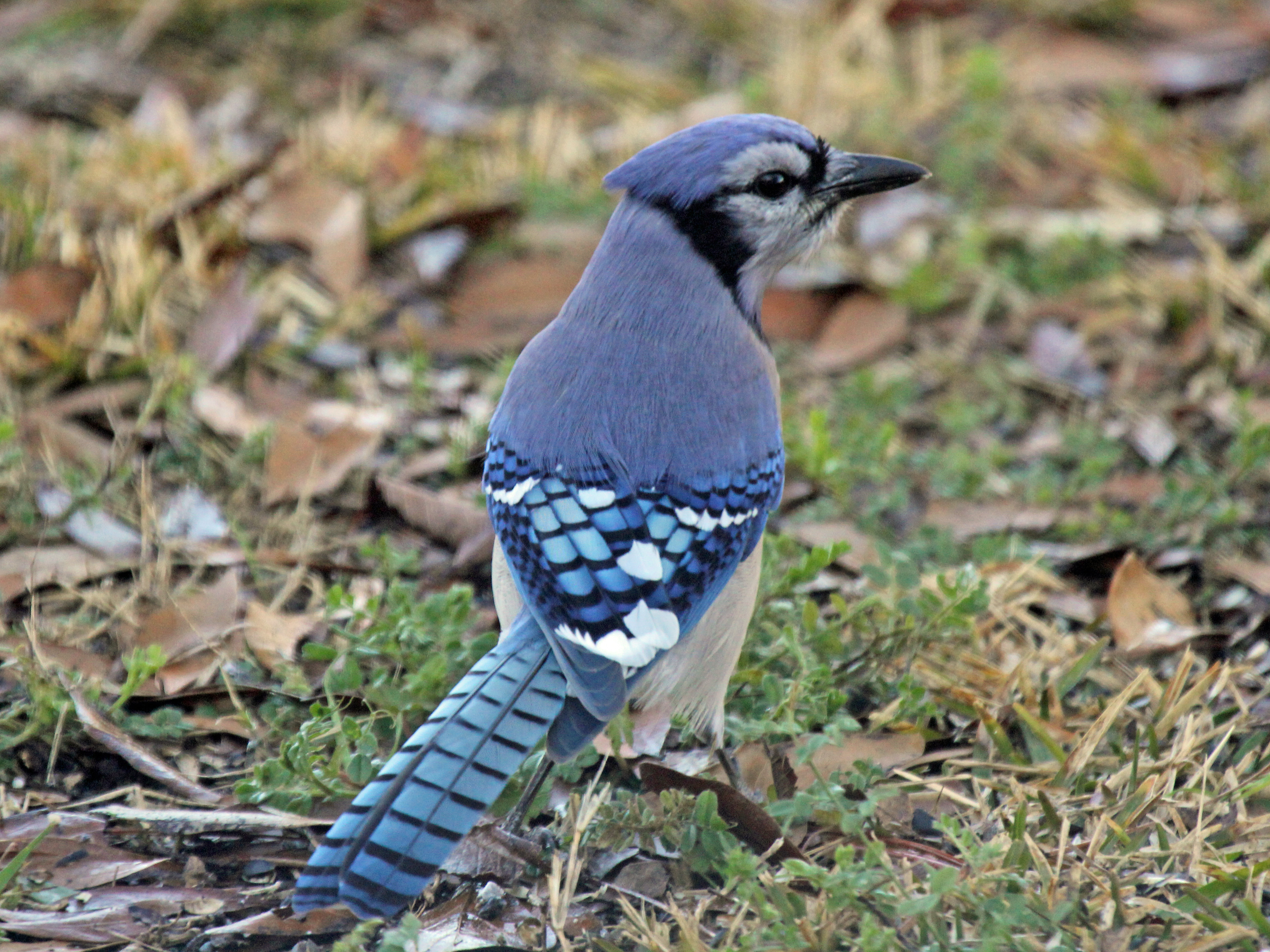
Blue jay

Order: Passeriformes Family: Corvidae

The family Corvidae includes crows, ravens, jays, choughs, magpies, treepies, nutcrackers, and ground jays. Corvids are above average in size among the Passeriformes, and some of the larger species show high levels of intelligence. Five species have been recorded in Ohio.

- Blue jay, Cyanocitta cristata (B)
- Black-billed magpie, Pica hudsonia (R)
- American crow, Corvus brachyrhynchos (B)
- Fish crow, Corvus ossifragus (B)
- Common raven, Corvus corax (B)

== Tits, chickadees, and titmice ==
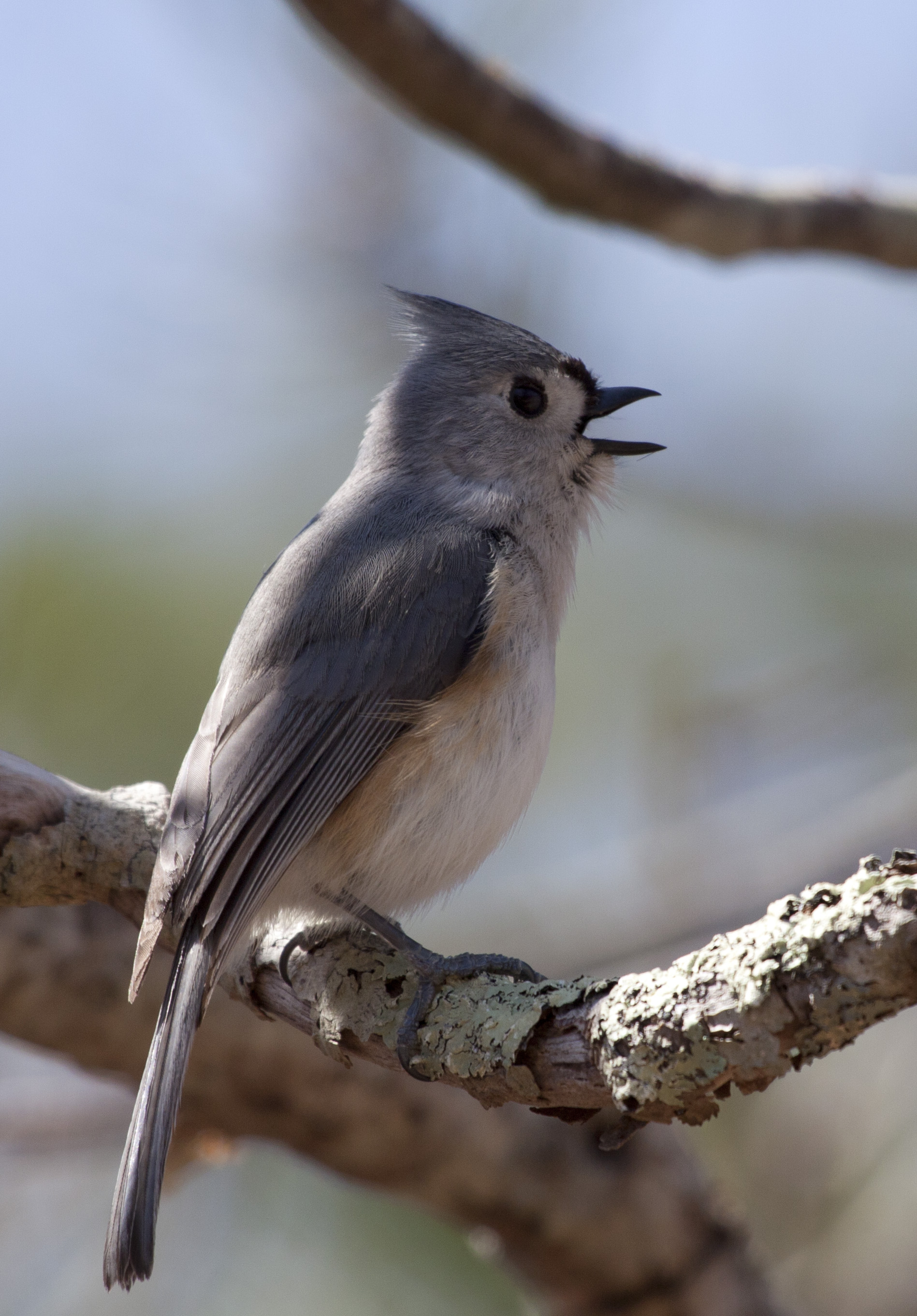
Tufted titmouse

Order: Passeriformes Family: Paridae

The Paridae are mainly small stocky woodland species with short stout bills. Some have crests. They are adaptable birds, with a mixed diet including seeds and insects. Four species have been recorded in Ohio.

- Carolina chickadee, Poecile carolinensis (B)
- Black-capped chickadee, Poecile atricapilla (B)
- Boreal chickadee, Poecile hudsonica (R)
- Tufted titmouse, Baeolophus bicolor (B)

== Larks ==
Order: Passeriformes Family: Alaudidae

Larks are small terrestrial birds with often extravagant songs and display flights. Most larks are fairly dull in appearance. Their food is insects and seeds. One species has been recorded in Ohio.

- Horned lark, Eremophila alpestris (B)

== Swallows ==
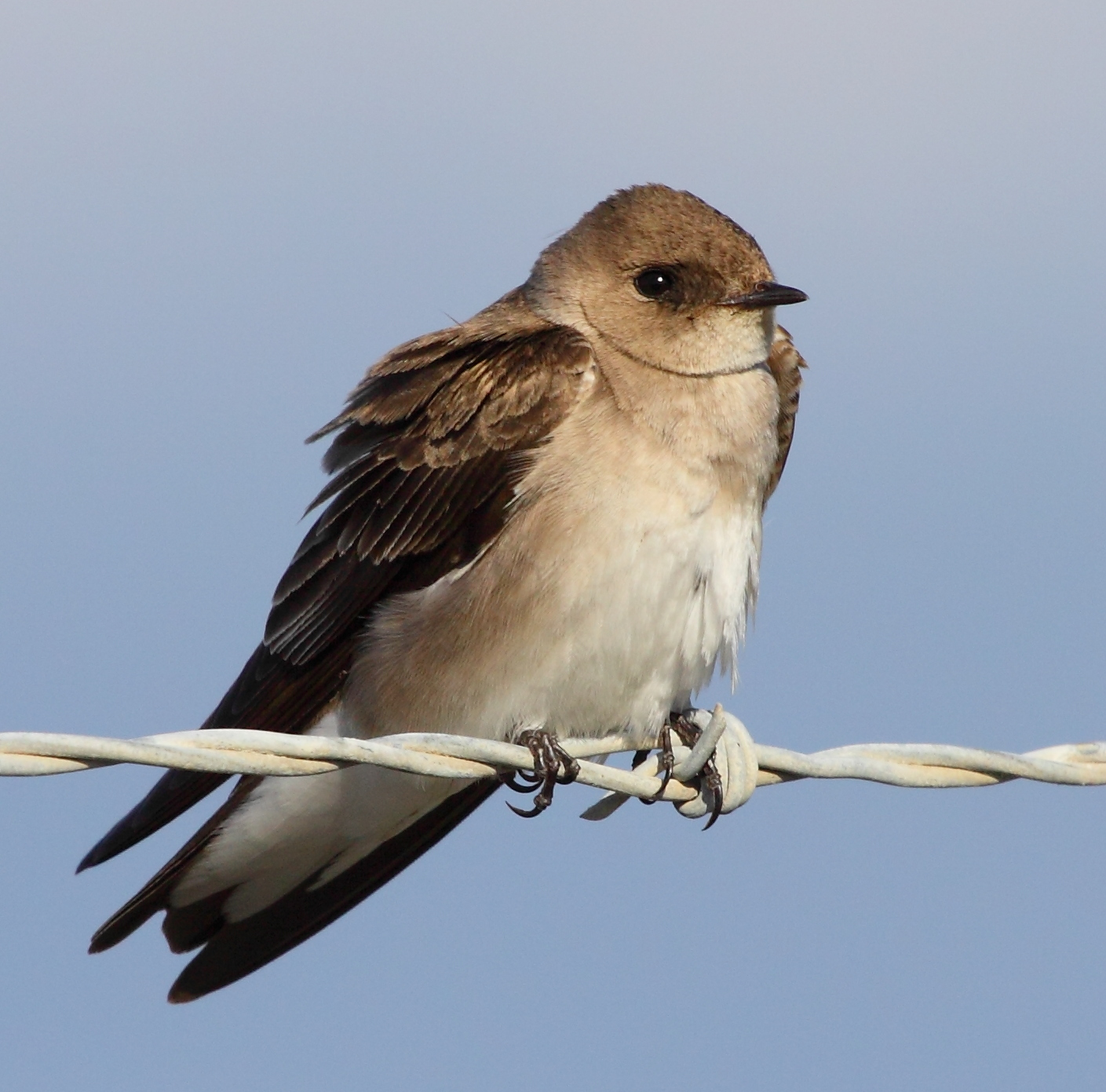
Northern rough-winged swallow

Order: Passeriformes Family: Hirundinidae

The family Hirundinidae is adapted to aerial feeding. They have a slender streamlined body, long pointed wings, and a short bill with a wide gape. The feet are adapted to perching rather than walking, and the front toes are partially joined at the base. Eight species have been recorded in Ohio.

- Bank swallow, Riparia riparia (B)
- Tree swallow, Tachycineta bicolor (B)
- Violet-green swallow, Tachycineta thalassina (R)
- Northern rough-winged swallow, Stelgidopteryx serripennis (B)
- Purple martin, Progne subis (B)
- Barn swallow, Hirundo rustica (B)
- Cliff swallow, Petrochelidon pyrrhonota (B)
- Cave swallow, Petrochelidon fulva (R)

== Kinglets ==
Order: Passeriformes Family: Regulidae

The kinglets are a small family of birds which resemble the titmice. They are very small insectivorous birds. The adults have colored crowns, giving rise to their names. Two species have been recorded in Ohio.

- Ruby-crowned kinglet, Corthylio calendula
- Golden-crowned kinglet, Regulus satrapa (B)

== Waxwings ==
Order: Passeriformes Family: Bombycillidae

The waxwings are a group of passerine birds with soft silky plumage and unique red tips to some of the wing feathers. In the Bohemian and cedar waxwings, these tips look like sealing wax and give the group its name. These are arboreal birds of northern forests. They live on insects in summer and berries in winter. Two species have been recorded in Ohio.

- Bohemian waxwing, Bombycilla garrulus (R)
- Cedar waxwing, Bombycilla cedrorum (B)

== Nuthatches ==
Order: Passeriformes Family: Sittidae

Nuthatches are small woodland birds. They have the unusual ability to climb down trees head first, unlike other birds which can only go upwards. Nuthatches have big heads, short tails, and powerful bills and feet. Three species have been recorded in Ohio.

- Red-breasted nuthatch, Sitta canadensis (B)
- White-breasted nuthatch, Sitta carolinensis (B)
- Brown-headed nuthatch, Sitta pusilla (R)

== Treecreepers ==
Order: Passeriformes Family: Certhiidae

Treecreepers are small woodland birds, brown above and white below. They have thin pointed down-curved bills, which they use to extricate insects from bark. They have stiff tail feathers, like woodpeckers, which they use to support themselves on vertical trees. One species has been recorded in Ohio.

- Brown creeper, Certhia americana (B)

== Gnatcatchers ==
Order: Passeriformes Family: Polioptilidae

These dainty birds resemble Old World warblers in their structure and habits, moving restlessly through the foliage seeking insects. The gnatcatchers are mainly soft bluish gray in color and have the typical insectivore's long sharp bill. Many species have distinctive black head patterns (especially males) and long, regularly cocked, black-and-white tails. One species has been recorded in Ohio.

- Blue-gray gnatcatcher, Polioptila caerulea (B)

== Wrens ==
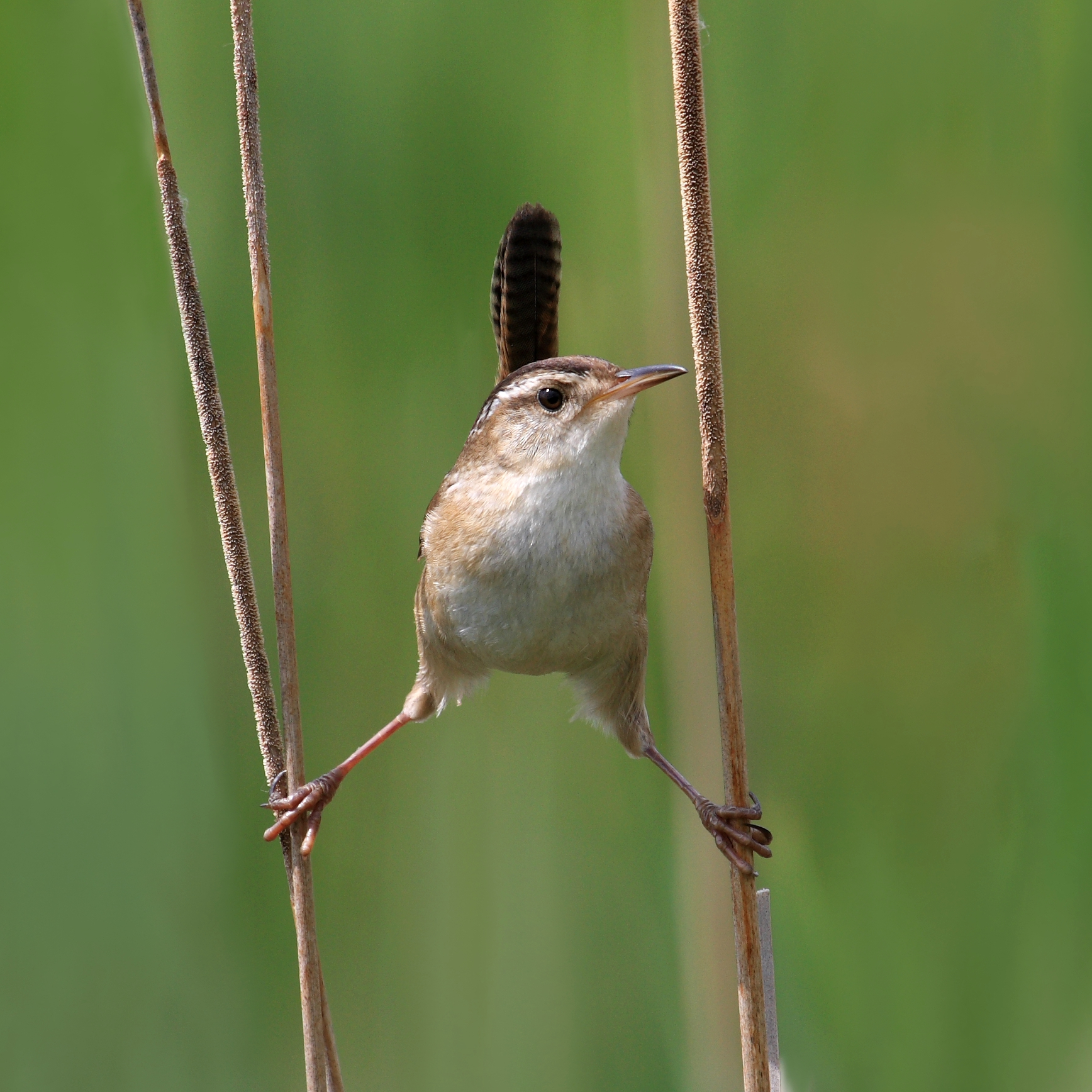
Marsh wren

Order: Passeriformes Family: Troglodytidae

Wrens are small and inconspicuous birds, except for their loud songs. They have short wings and thin down-turned bills. Several species often hold their tails upright. All are insectivorous. Seven species have been recorded in Ohio.

- Rock wren, Salpinctes obsoletus (R)
- Bewick's wren, Thryomanes bewickii (R)
- Carolina wren, Thryothorus ludovicianus (B)
- Northern house wren, Troglodytes aedon (B)
- Winter wren, Troglodytes hiemalis (B)
- Sedge wren, Cistothorus platensis (B)
- Marsh wren, Cistothorus palustris (B)

== Mockingbirds and thrashers ==
Order: Passeriformes Family: Mimidae

The mimids are a family of passerine birds which includes thrashers, mockingbirds, tremblers, and the New World catbirds. These birds are notable for their vocalization, especially their remarkable ability to mimic a wide variety of birds and other sounds heard outdoors. The species tend towards dull grays and browns in their appearance. Four species have been recorded in Ohio.

- Gray catbird, Dumetella carolinensis (B)
- Brown thrasher, Toxostoma rufum (B)
- Sage thrasher, Oreoscoptes montanus (R)
- Northern mockingbird, Mimus polyglottos (B)

== Starlings ==
Order: Passeriformes Family: Sturnidae

Starlings are small to medium-sized passerine birds. They are medium-sized passerines with strong feet. Their flight is strong and direct and they are very gregarious. Their preferred habitat is fairly open country, and they eat insects and fruit. Plumage is typically dark with a metallic sheen. One species has been recorded in Ohio.

- European starling, Sturnus vulgaris (I)(B)

== Thrushes and allies ==
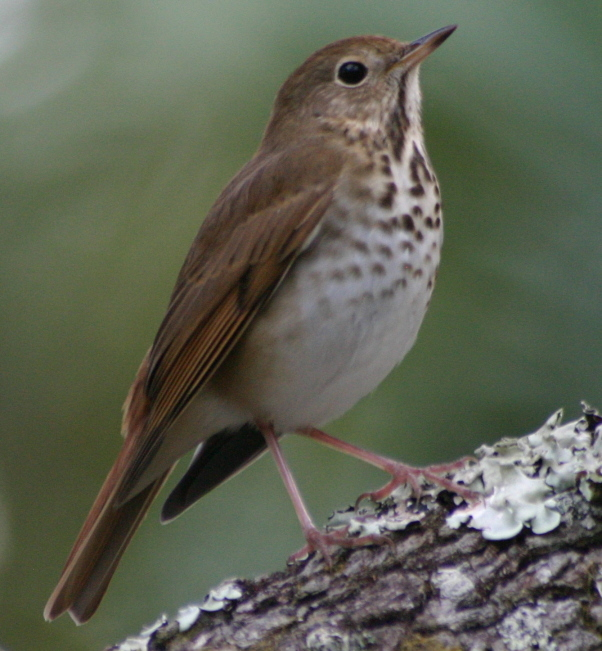
Hermit thrush

Order: Passeriformes Family: Turdidae

The thrushes are a group of passerine birds that occur mainly but not exclusively in the Old World. They are plump, soft plumaged, small to medium-sized insectivores or sometimes omnivores, often feeding on the ground. Many have attractive songs. Ten species have been recorded in Ohio.

- Eastern bluebird, Sialia sialis (B)
- Mountain bluebird, Sialia currucoides (R)
- Townsend's solitaire, Myadestes townsendi (R)
- Veery, Catharus fuscescens (B)
- Gray-cheeked thrush, Catharus minimus
- Swainson's thrush, Catharus ustulatus
- Hermit thrush, Catharus guttatus (B)
- Wood thrush, Hylocichla mustelina (B)
- American robin, Turdus migratorius (B)
- Varied thrush, Ixoreus naevius

== Old World flycatchers ==
Order: Passeriformes Family: Muscicapidae

The Old World flycatchers form a large family of small passerine birds. These are mainly small arboreal insectivores, many of which, as the name implies, take their prey on the wing. One species has been recorded in Ohio.

- Northern wheatear, Oenanthe oenanthe (R)

== Old World sparrows ==
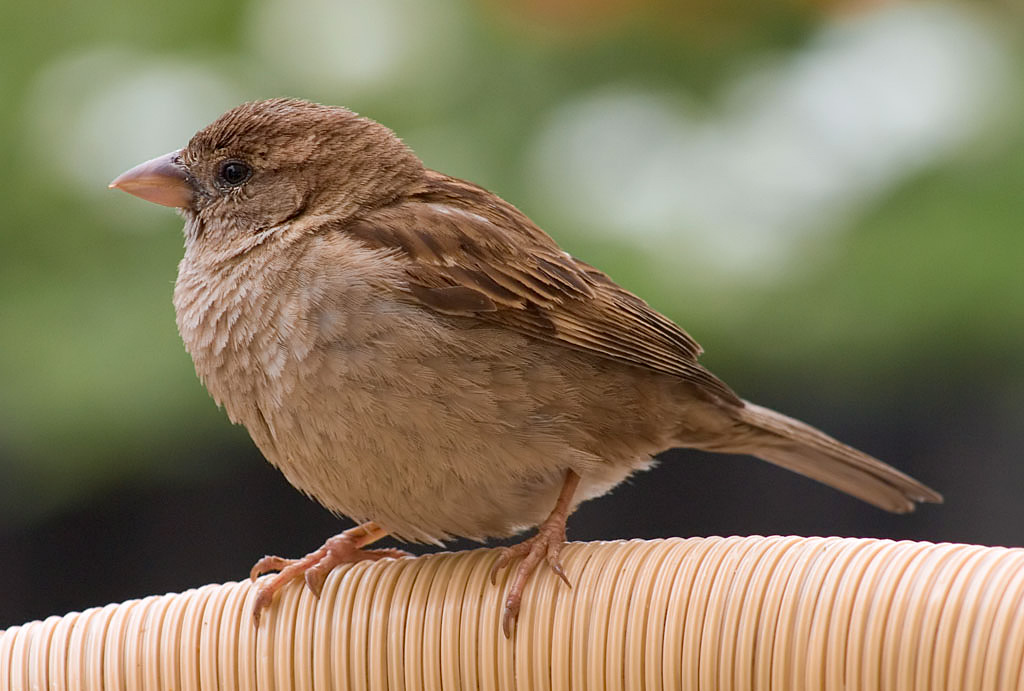
House sparrow

Order: Passeriformes Family: Passeridae

Old World sparrows are small passerine birds. In general, sparrows tend to be small plump brownish or grayish birds with short tails and short powerful beaks. Sparrows are seed eaters, but they also consume small insects. Two species have been recorded in Ohio.

- House sparrow, Passer domesticus (I) (B)
- Eurasian tree sparrow, Passer montanus (I) (R)

== Wagtails and pipits ==
Order: Passeriformes Family: Motacillidae

Motacillidae is a family of small passerine birds with medium to long tails. They include the wagtails, longclaws, and pipits. They are slender ground-feeding insectivores of open country. Three species have been recorded in Ohio.

- White wagtail, Motacilla alba (R)
- American pipit, Anthus rubescens
- Sprague's pipit, Anthus spragueii (R)

== Finches, euphonias, and allies ==
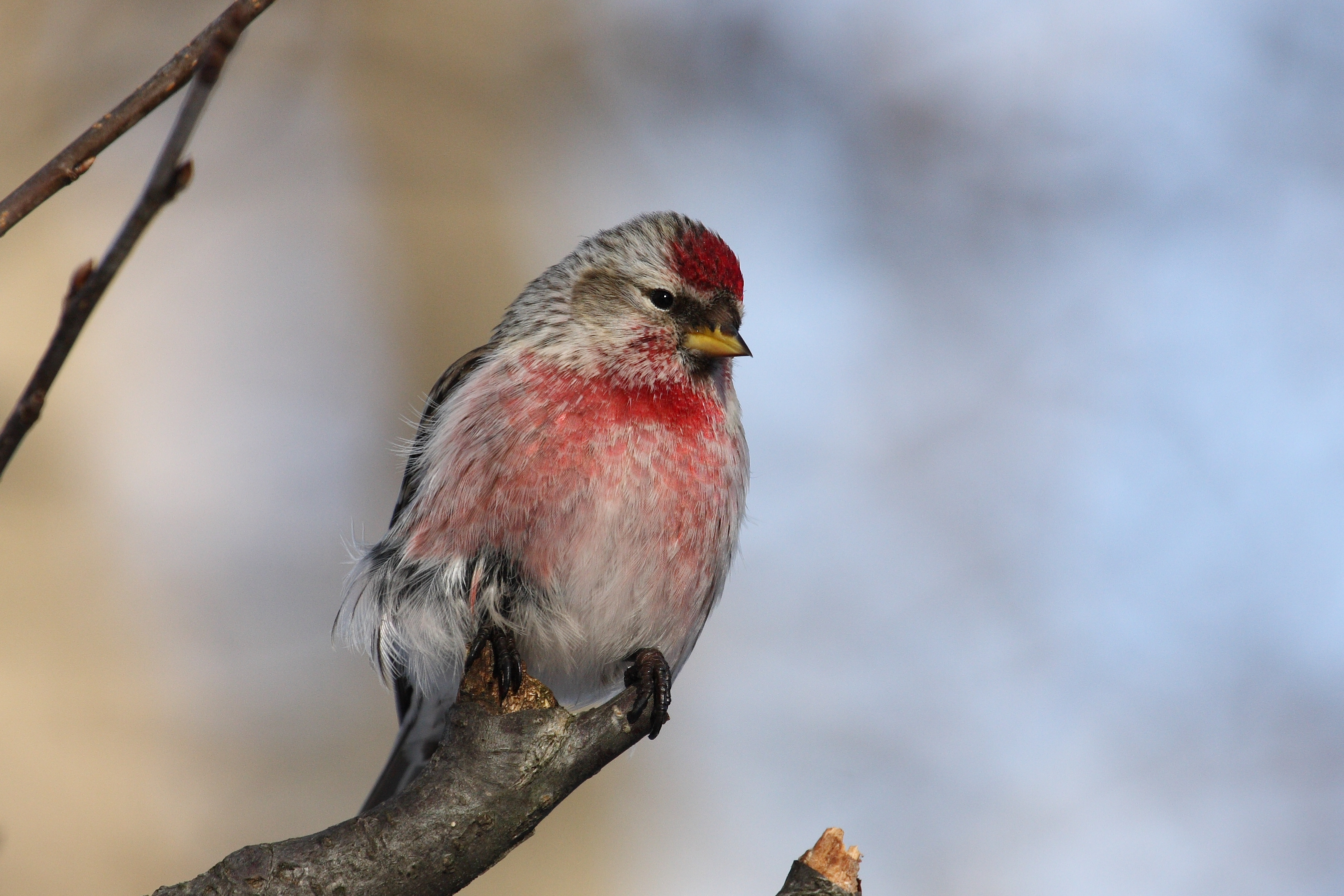
Redpoll

Order: Passeriformes Family: Fringillidae

Finches are seed-eating passerine birds that are small to moderately large and have a strong beak, usually conical and in some species very large. All have twelve tail feathers and nine primaries. These birds have a bouncing flight with alternating bouts of flapping and gliding on closed wings, and most sing well. Eleven species have been recorded in Ohio.

- Brambling, Fringilla montifringilla (R)
- Evening grosbeak, Coccothraustes vespertinus
- Pine grosbeak, Pinicola enucleator (R)
- Gray-crowned rosy-finch, Leucosticte tephrocotis (R)
- House finch, Haemorhous mexicanus (B) (Native to the southwestern US; introduced in the east)
- Purple finch, Haemorhous purpureus (B)
- Redpoll, Acanthis flammea
- Red crossbill, Loxia curvirostra
- White-winged crossbill, Loxia leucoptera
- Pine siskin, Spinus pinus (B)
- American goldfinch, Spinus tristis (B)

== Longspurs and snow buntings ==
Order: Passeriformes Family: Calcariidae

The Calcariidae are a group of passerine birds that had been traditionally grouped with the New World sparrows, but differ in a number of respects and are usually found in open grassy areas. Four species have been recorded in Ohio.

- Lapland longspur, Calcarius lapponicus
- Chestnut-collared longspur, Calcarius ornatus (R)
- Smith's longspur, Calcarius pictus
- Snow bunting, Plectrophenax nivalis

== New World sparrows ==
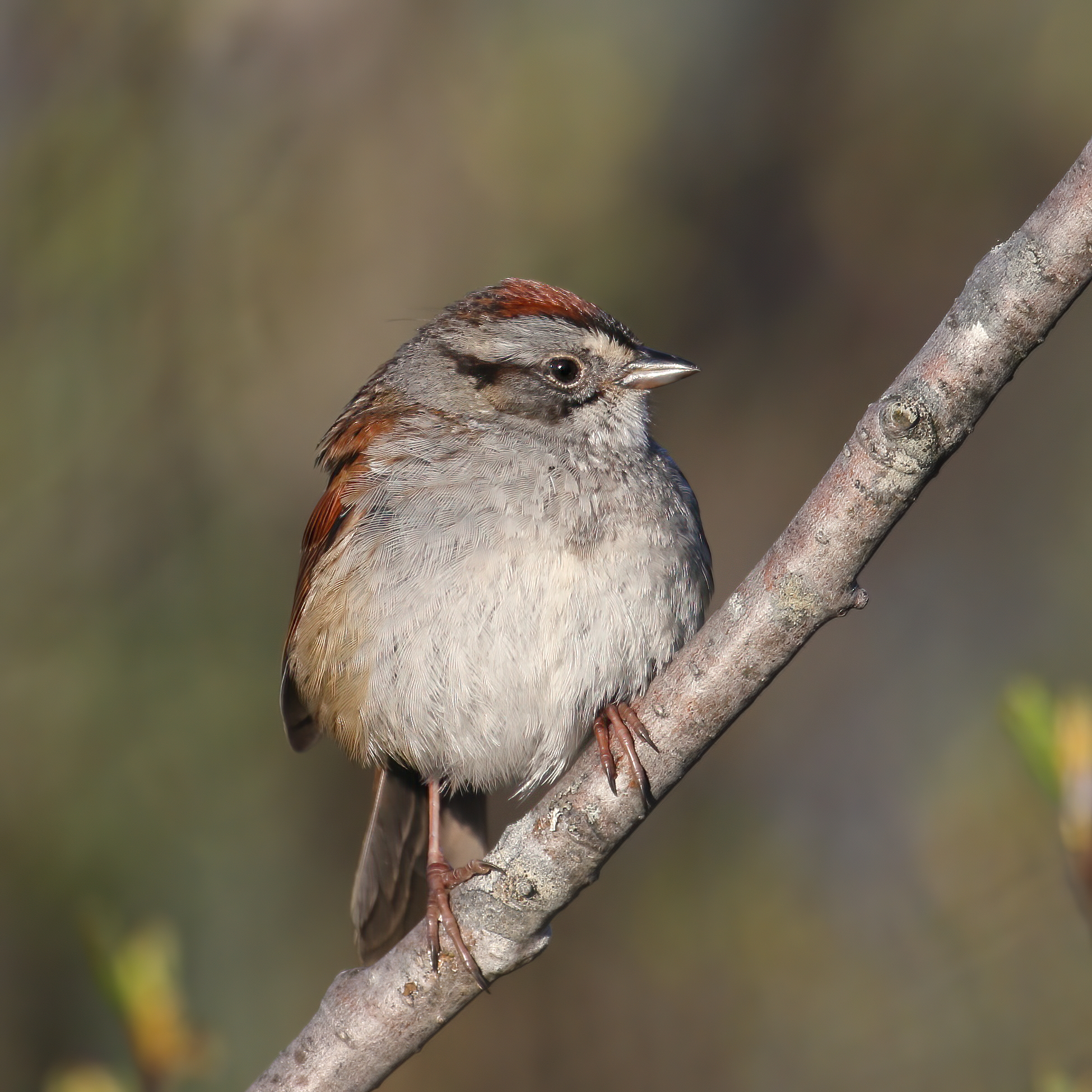
Swamp sparrow

Order: Passeriformes Family: Passerellidae

Until 2017, these species were considered part of family Emberizidae. Most of the species are known as sparrows, but these birds are not closely related to the Old World sparrows which are in the family Passeridae. Many of these have distinctive head patterns. Twenty-nine species have been recorded in Ohio.

- Cassin's sparrow, Peucaea cassinii (R)
- Bachman's sparrow, Peucaea aestivalis (R) (extirpated)
- Grasshopper sparrow, Ammodramus savannarum (B)
- Black-throated sparrow, Amphispiza bilineata (R)
- Lark sparrow, Chondestes grammacus (B)
- Lark bunting, Calamospiza melanocorys (R)
- Chipping sparrow, Spizella passerina (B)
- Clay-colored sparrow, Spizella pallida (B)
- Field sparrow, Spizella pusilla (B)
- Brewer's sparrow, Spizella breweri (R)
- Fox sparrow, Passerella iliaca
- American tree sparrow, Spizelloides arborea
- Dark-eyed junco, Junco hyemalis (B)
- White-crowned sparrow, Zonotrichia leucophrys
- Golden-crowned sparrow, Zonotrichia atricapilla (R)
- Harris's sparrow, Zonotrichia querula
- White-throated sparrow, Zonotrichia albicollis
- Vesper sparrow, Pooecetes gramineus (B)
- LeConte's sparrow, Ammospiza leconteii
- Nelson's sparrow, Ammospiza nelsoni
- Baird's sparrow, Centronyx bairdii (R)
- Henslow's sparrow, Centronyx henslowii (B)
- Savannah sparrow, Passerculus sandwichensis (B)
- Song sparrow, Melospiza melodia (B)
- Lincoln's sparrow, Melospiza lincolnii
- Swamp sparrow, Melospiza georgiana (B)
- Green-tailed towhee, Pipilo chlorurus (R)
- Spotted towhee, Pipilo maculatus (R)
- Eastern towhee, Pipilo erythrophthalmus (B)

== Yellow-breasted chat ==
Order: Passeriformes Family: Icteriidae

This species was historically placed in the wood-warblers (Parulidae) but nonetheless most authorities were unsure if it belonged there. It was placed in its own family in 2017.

- Yellow-breasted chat, Icteria virens

== Troupials and allies ==
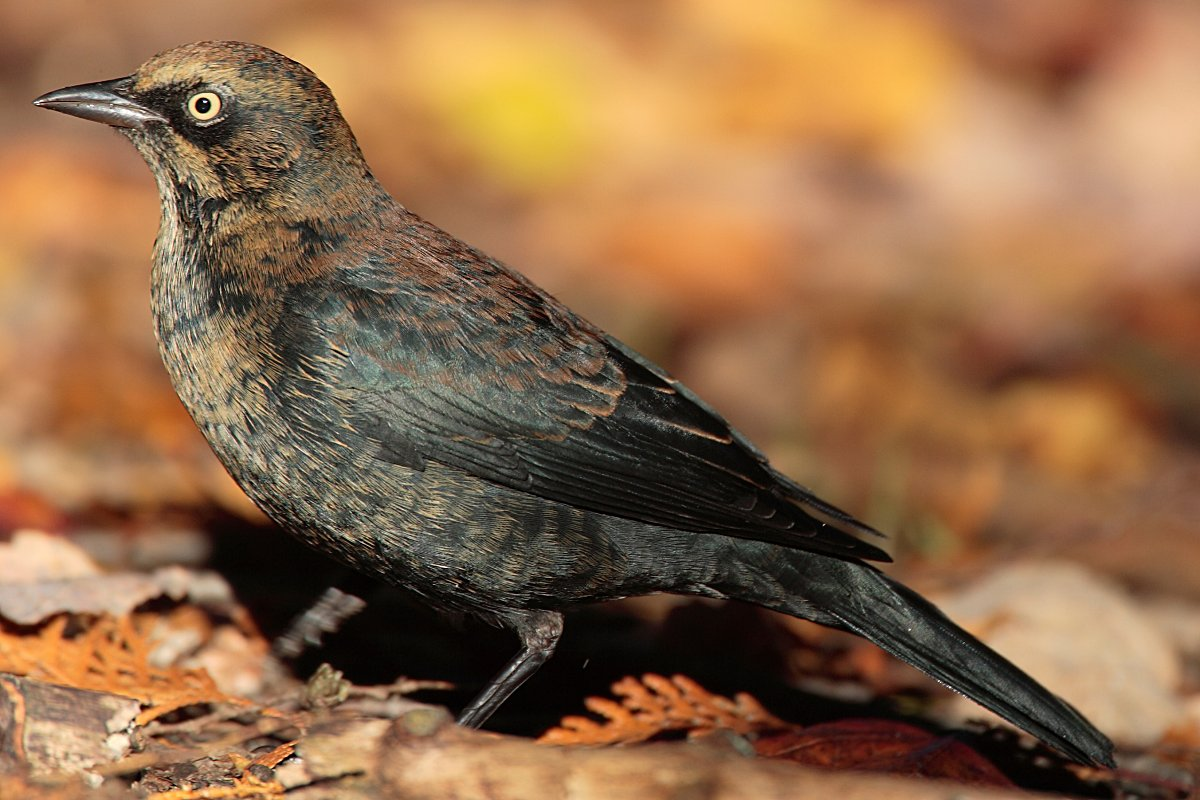
Rusty blackbird

Order: Passeriformes Family: Icteridae

The icterids are a group of small to medium-sized, often colorful passerine birds restricted to the New World and include the grackles, New World blackbirds, and New World orioles. Most species have black as a predominant plumage color, often enlivened by yellow, orange, or red. Fourteen species have been recorded in Ohio.

- Yellow-headed blackbird, Xanthocephalus xanthocephalus (B)
- Bobolink, Dolichonyx oryzivorus (B)
- Eastern meadowlark, Sturnella magna (B)
- Western meadowlark, Sturnella neglecta (B)
- Orchard oriole, Icterus spurius (B)
- Hooded oriole, Icterus cucullatus (R)
- Bullock's oriole, Icterus bullockii (R)
- Baltimore oriole, Icterus galbula (B)
- Red-winged blackbird, Agelaius phoeniceus (B)
- Brown-headed cowbird, Molothrus ater (B)
- Rusty blackbird, Euphagus carolinus
- Brewer's blackbird, Euphagus cyanocephalus
- Common grackle, Quiscalus quiscula (B)
- Great-tailed grackle, Quiscalus mexicanus (R)

== New World warblers ==
Order: Passeriformes Family: Parulidae

The wood-warblers are a group of small and often colorful passerine birds restricted to the New World. Most are arboreal, but some, like the ovenbird and the two waterthrushes, are more terrestrial. Most members of this family are insectivores. Forty-one species have been recorded in Ohio.

- Ovenbird, Seiurus aurocapilla (B)
- Worm-eating warbler, Helmitheros vermivorus (B)
- Louisiana waterthrush, Parkesia motacilla (B)
- Northern waterthrush, Parkesia noveboracensis (B)
- Golden-winged warbler, Vermivora chrysoptera
- Blue-winged warbler, Vermivora cyanoptera (B)
- Black-and-white warbler, Mniotilta varia (B)
- Prothonotary warbler, Protonotaria citrea (B)
- Swainson's warbler, Limnothlypis swainsonii (R)
- Tennessee warbler, Leiothlypis peregrina
- Orange-crowned warbler, Leiothlypis celata
- Nashville warbler, Leiothlypis ruficapilla (B)
- Virginia's warbler, Leiothlypis virginiae (R)
- Connecticut warbler, Oporornis agilis
- Mourning warbler, Geothlypis philadelphia (B)
- Kentucky warbler, Geothlypis formosa (B)
- Common yellowthroat, Geothlypis trichas (B)
- Hooded warbler, Setophaga citrina (B)
- American redstart, Setophaga ruticilla (B)
- Kirtland's warbler, Setophaga kirtlandii
- Cape May warbler, Setophaga tigrina
- Cerulean warbler, Setophaga cerulea (B)
- Northern parula, Setophaga americana (B)
- Magnolia warbler, Setophaga magnolia (B)
- Bay-breasted warbler, Setophaga castanea
- Blackburnian warbler, Setophaga fusca (B)
- Yellow warbler, Setophaga petechia (B)
- Chestnut-sided warbler, Setophaga pensylvanica (B)
- Blackpoll warbler, Setophaga striata
- Black-throated blue warbler, Setophaga caerulescens (B)
- Palm warbler, Setophaga palmarum
- Pine warbler, Setophaga pinus (B)
- Yellow-rumped warbler, Setophaga coronata
- Yellow-throated warbler, Setophaga dominica (B)
- Prairie warbler, Setophaga discolor (B)
- Black-throated gray warbler, Setophaga nigrescens (R)
- Townsend's warbler, Setophaga townsendi (R)
- Black-throated green warbler, Setophaga virens (B)
- Canada warbler, Cardellina canadensis (B)
- Wilson's warbler, Cardellina pusilla
- Painted redstart, Myioborus pictus (R)
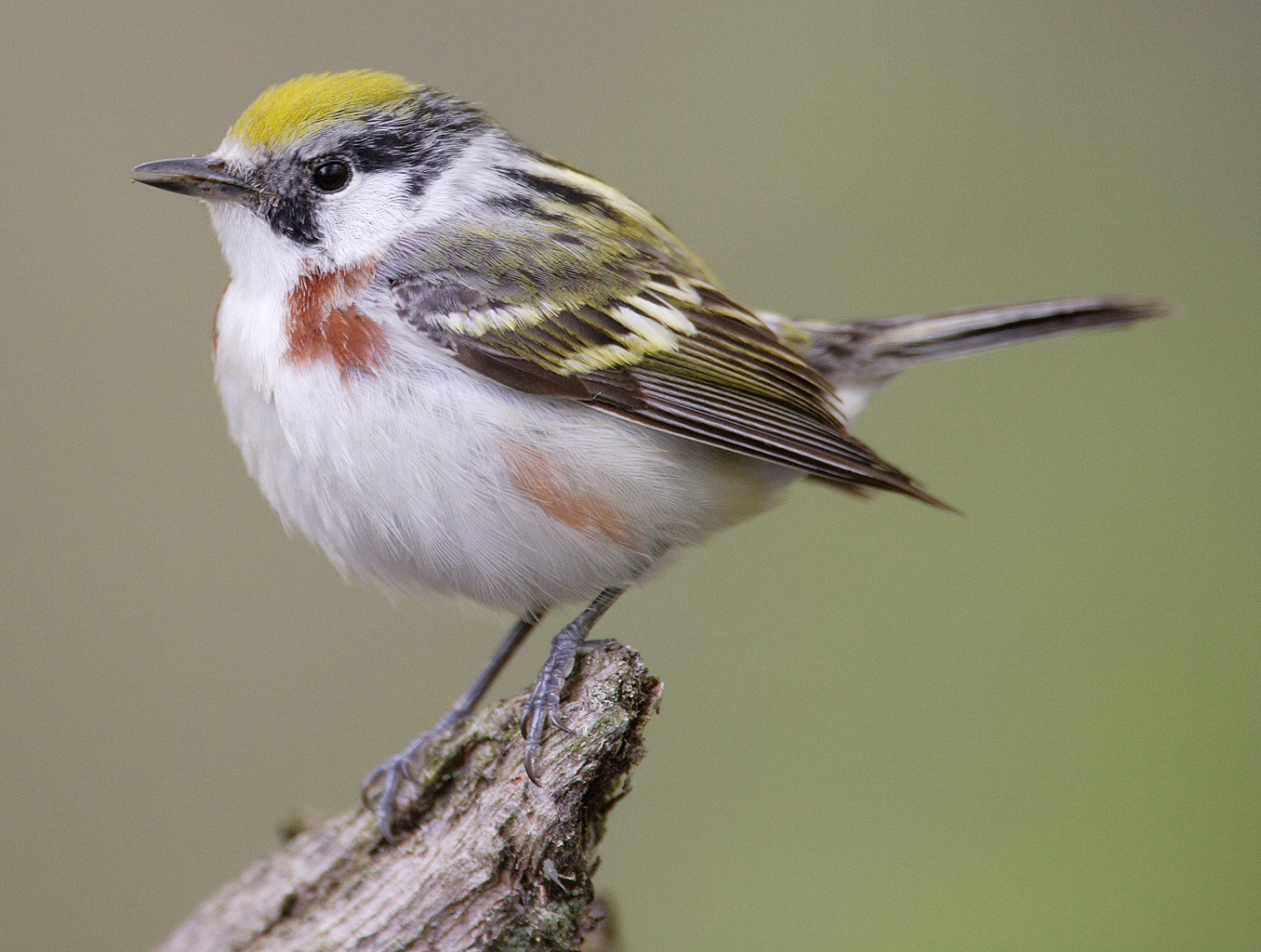
Chestnut-sided warbler

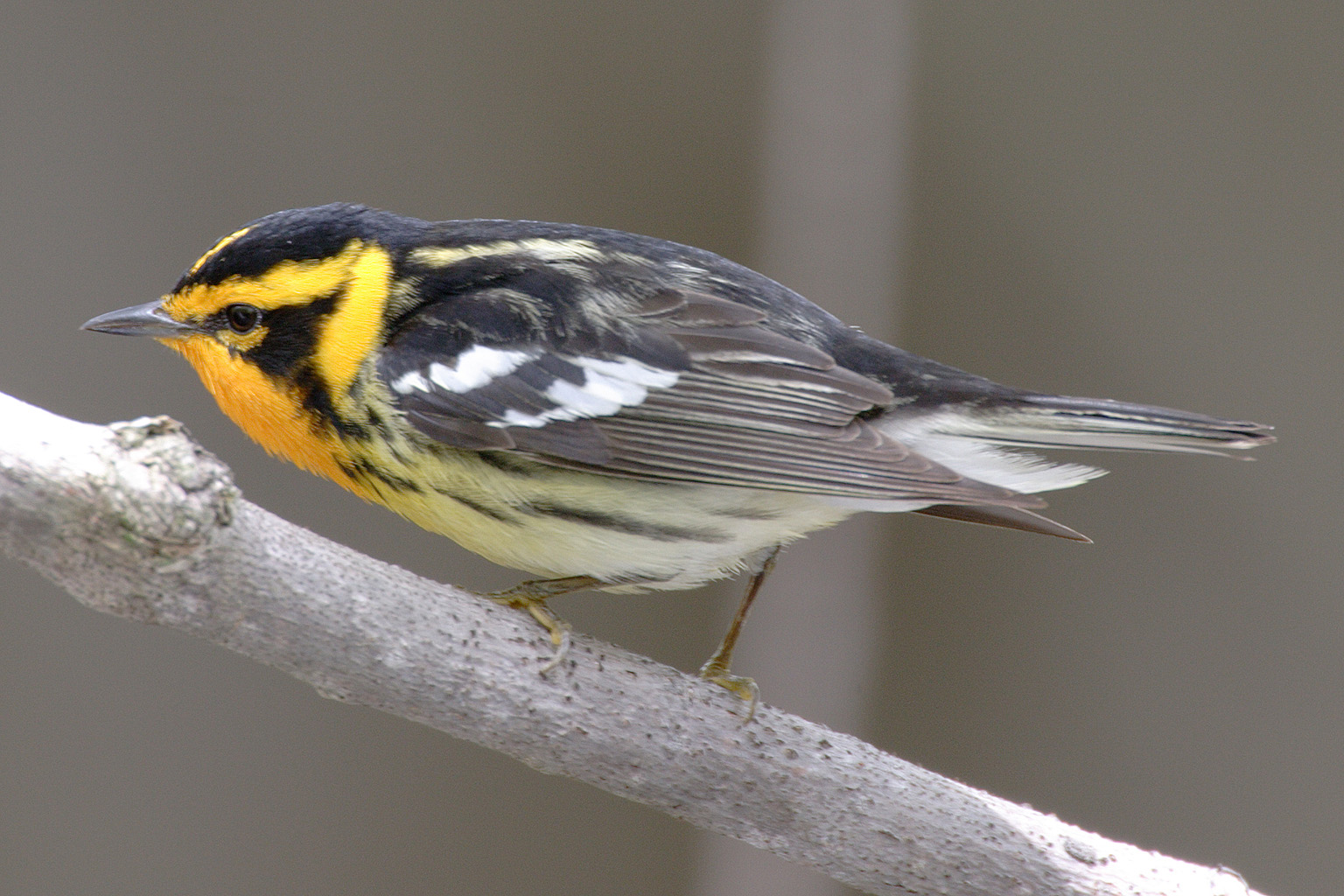
Blackburnian warbler

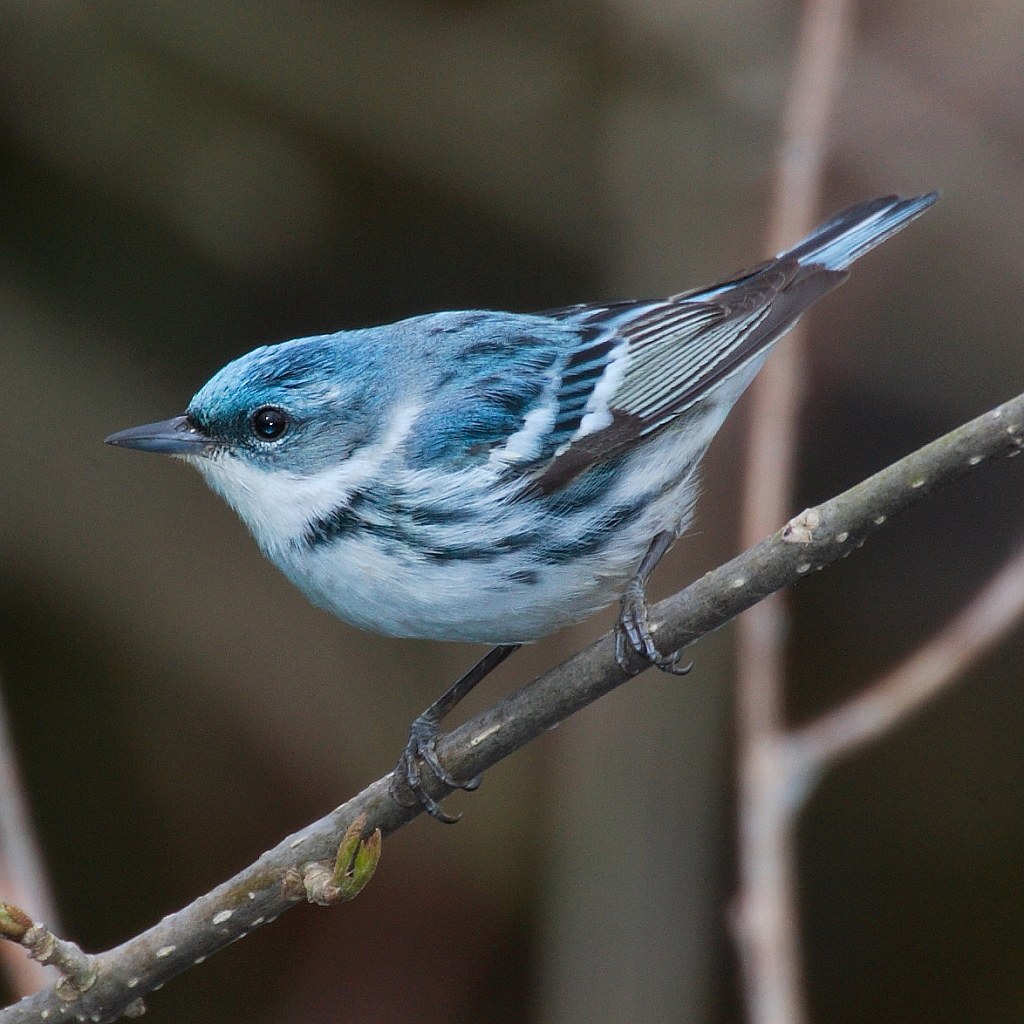
Cerulean warbler

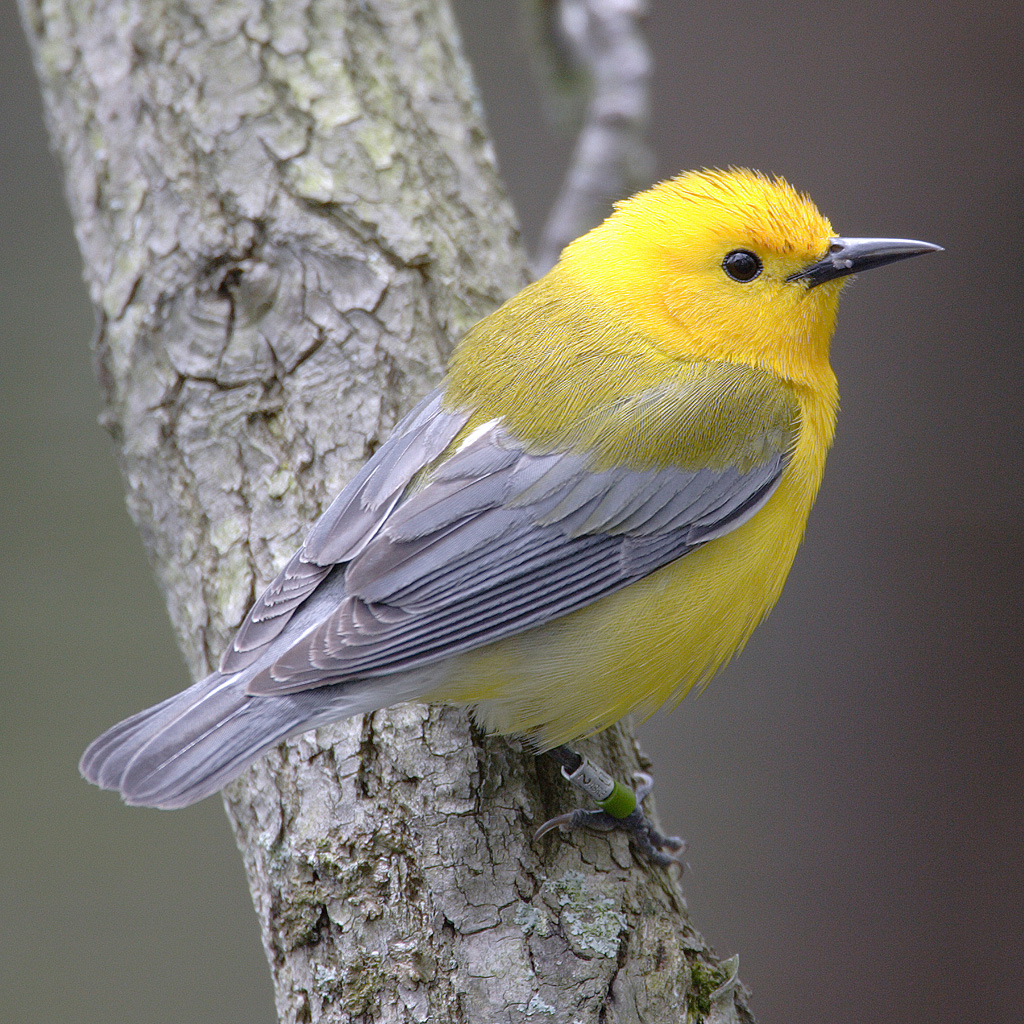
Prothonotary warbler

== Cardinals and allies ==
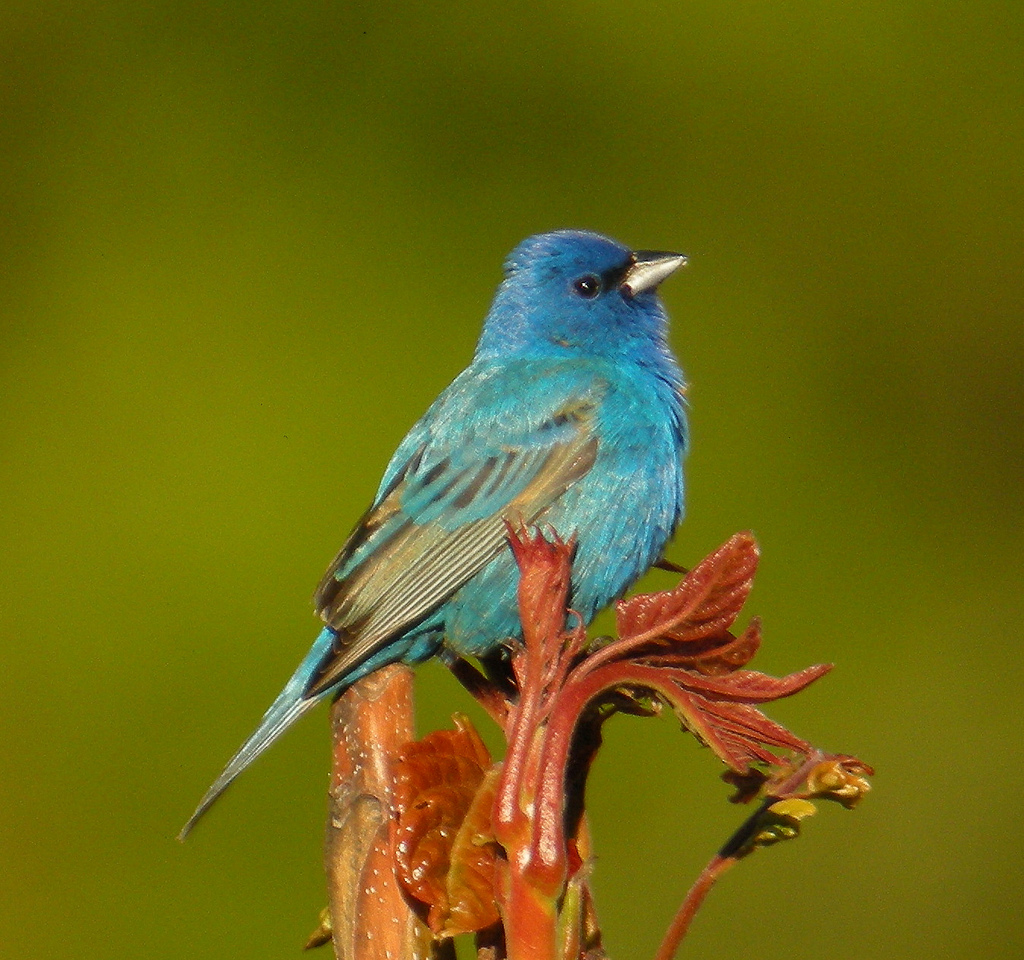
Indigo bunting

Order: Passeriformes Family: Cardinalidae

The cardinals are a family of robust, seed-eating birds with strong bills. They are typically associated with open woodland. The sexes usually have distinct plumages. Eleven species have been recorded in Ohio.

- Summer tanager, Piranga rubra (B)
- Scarlet tanager, Piranga olivacea (B)
- Western tanager, Piranga ludoviciana
- Northern cardinal, Cardinalis cardinalis (B)
- Rose-breasted grosbeak, Pheucticus ludovicianus (B)
- Black-headed grosbeak, Pheucticus melanocephalus (R)
- Blue grosbeak, Passerina caerulea (B)
- Lazuli bunting, Passerina amoena (R)
- Indigo bunting, Passerina cyanea (B)
- Painted bunting, Passerina ciris
- Dickcissel, Spiza americana (B)

== See also ==
- List of birds of Cuyahoga Valley National Park
- List of birds
- Lists of birds by region
- List of mammals of Ohio
- List of North American birds
