= Feather hole =

Type of damage to bird feathers

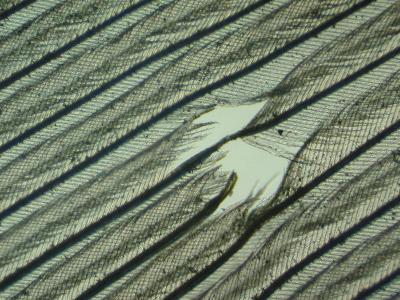
A feeding trace of Brueelia lice on the tail feather of Barn swallow.

Feather holes often characteristically occur on wing and tail feathers of some small-bodied species of passerines. In the case of barn swallows, it was suggested that the holes were feeding traces of avian lice, either Machaerilaemus malleus and/or Myrsidea rustica (both Phthiraptera: Amblycera).

Hole counts were shown to be highly repeatable, and thus counts appeared to be useful measures to quantify the intensity of infestation. Since then, a number of influential papers have been published on the evolutionary, ecological, and behavioral aspects of host-parasite interactions based on the assumption that holes were chewed by Machaerilaemus malleus. More specifically, host sexual selection, feather breakage, flight performance, immunity levels, arrival dates, and even song characteristics were shown to covary with the number of holes. Cross-fostering experiments showed that infestation levels were heritable.

Recently, however, it was shown that Machaerilaemus malleus is apparently absent from Europe, where all these studies were carried out. Correlational evidence supports the hypothesis that feather holes are feeding traces of lice, however, the occurrence of Brueelia spp. lice (Phthiraptera: Ischnocera) provides the best fit to the distribution and abundance of feather holes both in barn swallows and across several small passerines.
