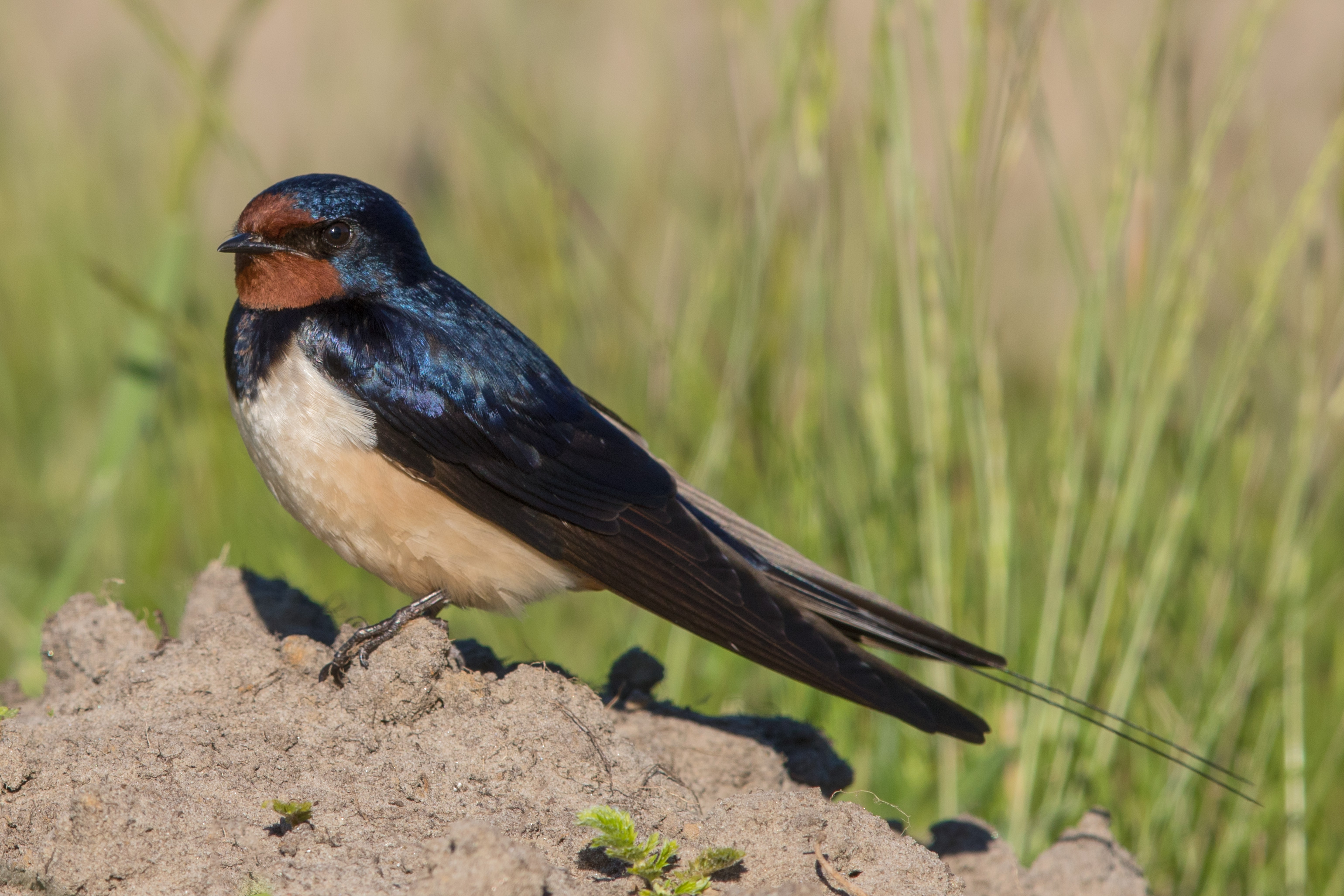
- In Tönning, Germany

Conservation status
- Least Concern (IUCN 3.1)

Scientific classification
- Kingdom: Animalia
- Phylum: Chordata
- Class: Aves
- Order: Passeriformes
- Family: Hirundinidae
- Genus: Hirundo
- Species: H. rustica

Binomial name
- Hirundo rustica Linnaeus, 1758

Subspecies
- 6, see text
- Range of H. rustica Breeding Resident Passage Non-breeding

Synonyms
- Hirundo erythrogaster (Boddaert, 1783)

Audio
- Hirundo rustica calling in Philadelphia

= Barn swallow =

Species of bird

The barn swallow (Hirundo rustica) is the most widespread species of swallow in the world, occurring on all continents, with vagrants reported even in Antarctica. It is a distinctive passerine bird with blue upperparts and a long, deeply forked tail. In Anglophone Europe, it is just called the swallow; in northern Europe, it is the only member of family Hirundinidae called a "swallow" rather than a "martin".

There are eight subspecies of barn swallow, which breed across the Northern Hemisphere. Two subspecies (H. r. savignii and H. r. transitiva) have fairly restricted ranges in the Nile valley and eastern Mediterranean, respectively. The other six are more widespread, with winter ranges covering much of the Southern Hemisphere.

The barn swallow is a bird of open country that normally nests in man-made structures and consequently has spread with human expansion. It builds a cup nest from mud pellets in barns or similar structures and feeds on insects caught in flight. This species lives in close association with humans, and its insect-eating habits mean that it is tolerated by humans; this acceptance was reinforced in the past by superstitions regarding the bird and its nest. There are frequent cultural references to the barn swallow in literary and religious works due to both its living in close proximity to humans and its annual migration. The barn swallow is the national bird of Austria and Estonia.

== Description ==
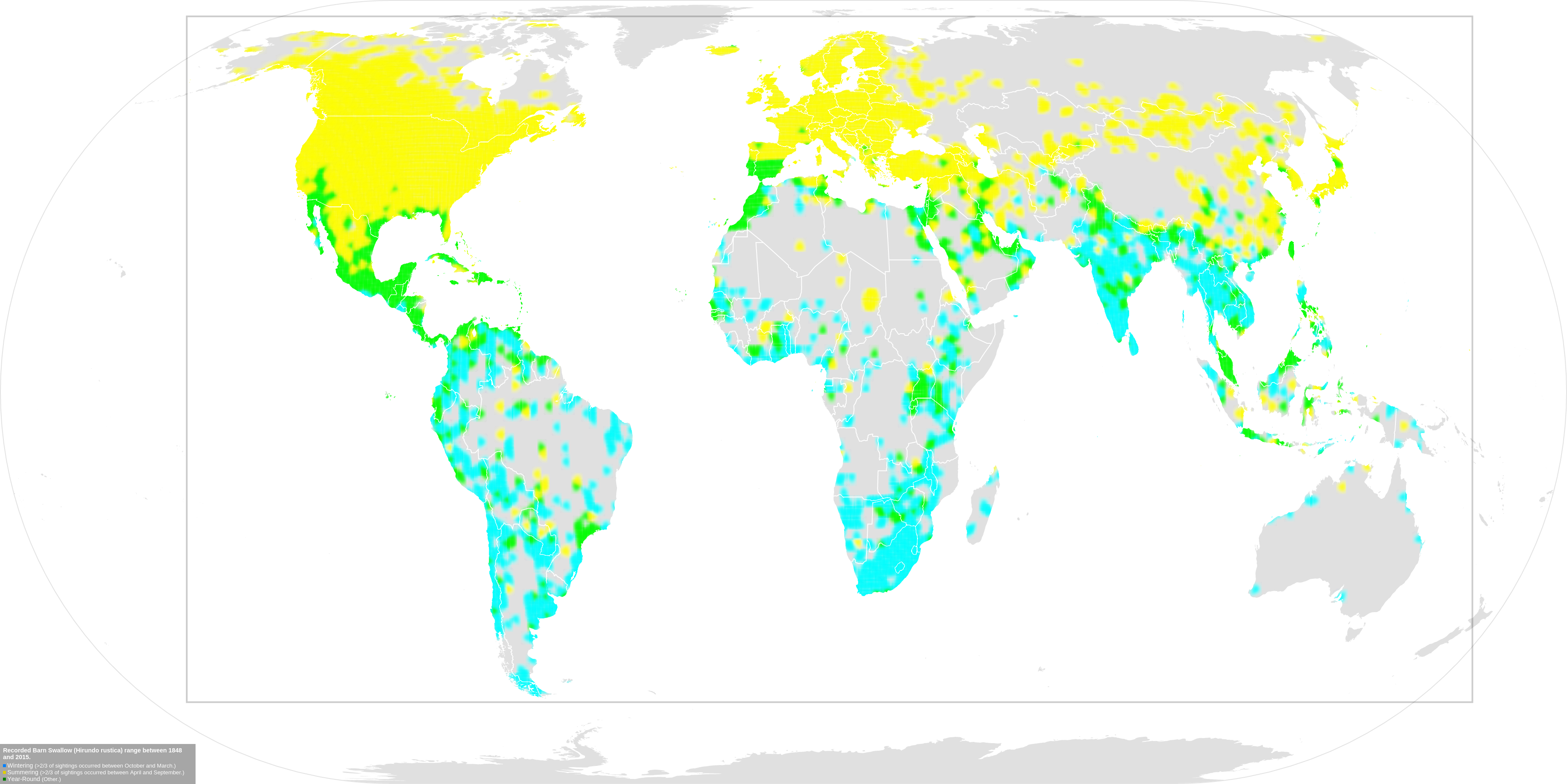
Reported range from observations submitted to eBird shows the migration pattern of the species Year-round range Summer range Winter range

The adult male barn swallow of the nominate subspecies H. r. rustica is 17–19 cm (6 1/2–7 1/2 in) long including 2–7 cm (1–3 in) of elongated outer tail feathers. It has a wingspan of 32–34.5 cm (12 1/2–13 1/2 in) and weighs 16–22 g (9/16–3/4 oz). It has steel blue upperparts and a rufous forehead, chin and throat, which are separated from the off-white underparts by a broad dark blue breast band. The outer tail feathers are elongated, giving the distinctive deeply forked "swallow tail". There is a line of white spots across the outer end of the upper tail. The female is similar in appearance to the male, but the tail streamers are shorter, the blue of the upperparts and breast band is less glossy, and the underparts paler. The juvenile is browner and has a paler rufous face and whiter underparts. It also lacks the long tail streamers of the adult.

Although both sexes sing, female song was only recently described. (See below for details about song.) Calls include witt or witt-witt and a loud splee-plink when excited or trying to chase intruders away from the nest. The alarm calls include a sharp siflitt for predators like cats and a flitt-flitt for birds of prey like the hobby. This species is fairly quiet on the wintering grounds.

The distinctive combination of a red face and blue breast band renders the adult barn swallow easy to distinguish from the African Hirundo species and from the welcome swallow (Hirundo neoxena) with which its range overlaps in Australasia. In Africa the short tail streamers of the juvenile barn swallow invite confusion with juvenile red-chested swallow (Hirundo lucida), but the latter has a narrower breast band and more white in the tail.

== Taxonomy ==
The barn swallow was described by Carl Linnaeus in his 1758 10th edition of Systema Naturae as Hirundo rustica, characterised as "H. rectricibus, exceptis duabus intermediis, macula alba notatîs". Hirundo is the Latin word for "swallow"; rusticus means "of the country". This species is the only one of that genus to have a range extending into the Americas, with the majority of Hirundo species being native to Africa. This genus of blue-backed swallows is sometimes called the "barn swallows".

The Oxford English Dictionary dates the English common name "barn swallow" to 1851, though an earlier instance of the collocation in an English-language context is in Gilbert White's popular book The Natural History of Selborne, originally published in 1789:

The swallow, though called the chimney-swallow, by no means builds altogether in chimnies [sic], but often within barns and out-houses against the rafters ... In Sweden she builds in barns, and is called ladusvala, the barn-swallow.

Recording of barn swallows
Song recorded at the Minnesota Valley National Wildlife Refuge

This suggests that the English name may be a calque on the Swedish term.

There are few taxonomic problems within the genus, but the red-chested swallow, a resident of West Africa, the Congo Basin, and Ethiopia, was formerly treated as a subspecies of barn swallow. The red-chested swallow is slightly smaller than its migratory relative, has a narrower blue breast-band, and (in the adult) has shorter tail streamers. In flight, it looks paler underneath than barn swallow.

=== Subspecies ===
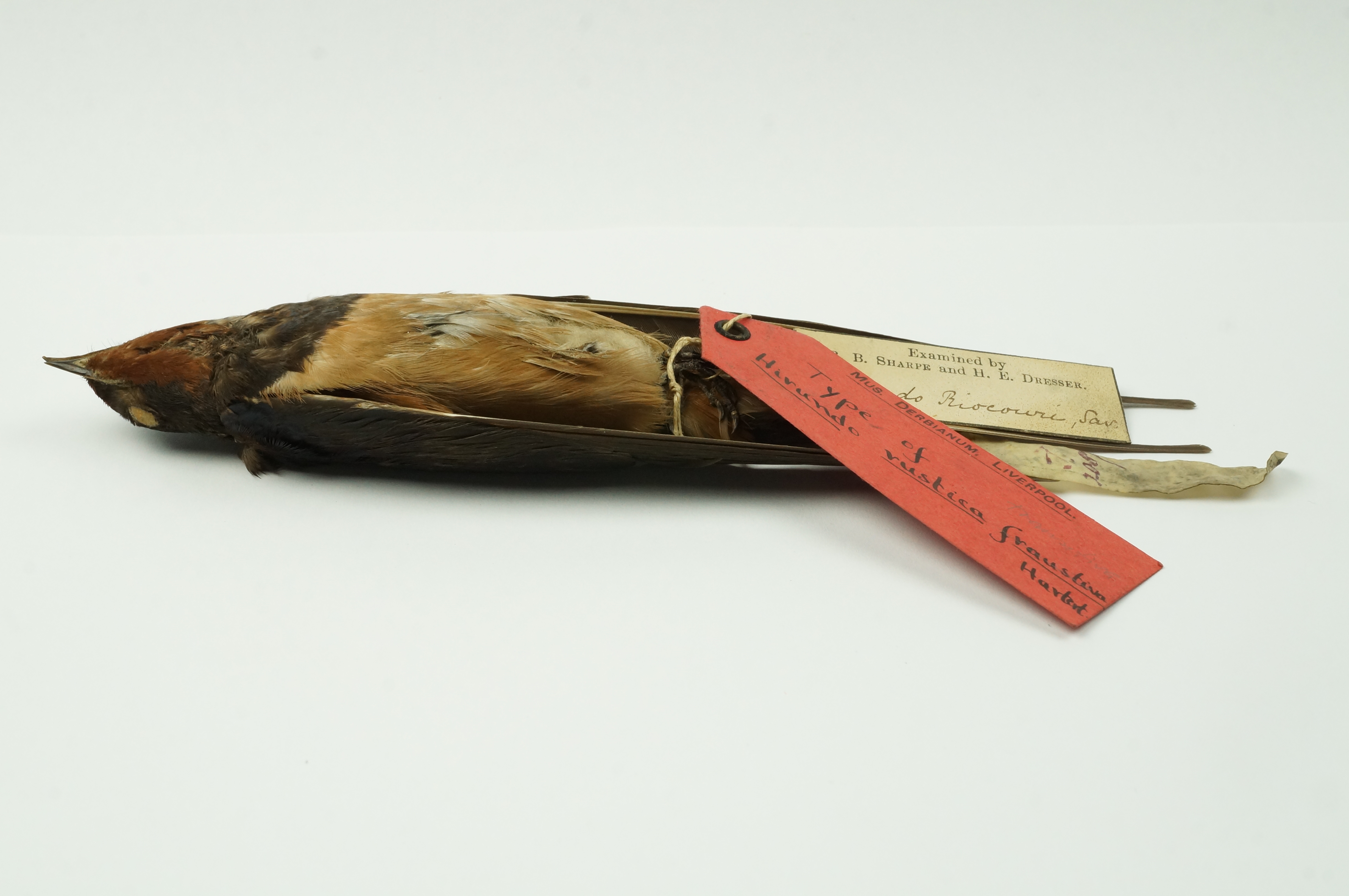
Holotype of Chelidon rustica transitiva Hartert (NML-VZ T2057) held at World Museum, National Museums Liverpool

A European barn swallow pauses to rest on a fence post beside a freshwater lake on Lindisfarne.

Eight subspecies of barn swallow are generally recognised. In eastern Asia, a number of additional or alternative forms have been proposed, including H. r. kamtschatica by Benedykt Dybowski in 1883 and H. r. ambigua by Erwin Stresemann. Given the uncertainties over the validity of these forms, this article follows the IOC World Bird List and AviList.

- H. r. rustica, the nominate European subspecies, breeds in Europe and Asia, as far north as the Arctic Circle, south to North Africa, the Middle East and Sikkim, and east to the Yenisei River. It migrates on a broad front to winter in Africa, Arabia, and the Indian subcontinent. The barn swallows wintering in southern Africa are from across Eurasia to at least 91°E, and have been recorded as covering up to 11,660 km (7,250 mi) on their annual migration. The nominate European subspecies was the first to have its genome sequenced and published.
- H. r. transitiva was described by Ernst Hartert in 1910. It breeds in the Middle East from southern Turkey to Israel and is partially resident, though some birds winter in East Africa. It has orange-red underparts and a broken breast band. The holotype of Chelidon rustica transitiva Hartert (Vog. pal. Fauna, Heft 6, 1910. p. 802), an adult female, is held in the vertebrate zoology collection of National Museums Liverpool at World Museum, with accession number NML-VZ T2057. The specimen was collected in the Plains of Esdraclon, Palestine on 16 December 1863 by Henry Baker Tristram. The specimen came to the Liverpool national collection through the purchase of Canon Henry Baker Tristram's collection by the museum in 1896.
- H. r. savignii, the resident Egyptian subspecies, was described by James Stephens in 1817 and named after the French zoologist Marie Jules César Savigny. It resembles H. r. transitiva, which also has orange-red underparts, but H. r. savignii has a complete broad breast band and deeper red hue on the underparts; unlike the other subspecies it is non-migratory.
- H. r. gutturalis, described by Giovanni Antonio Scopoli in 1786, has whitish underparts and a broken breast band. The breast is chestnut and the lower underparts more pink-buff. The populations that breed in the central and eastern Himalayas have been included in this subspecies, although the primary breeding range is Japan and Korea. The east Asian breeders winter across tropical Asia from India and Sri Lanka east to Indonesia and New Guinea. Increasing numbers are wintering in Australia. It hybridises with H. r. tytleri in the Amur River area. It is thought that the two eastern Asia forms were once geographically separate, but the nest sites provided by expanding human habitation allowed the ranges to overlap. H. r. gutturalis is a vagrant to Alaska and Washington, but is easily distinguished from the North American breeding subspecies, H. r. erythrogaster, by the latter's reddish underparts.
- H. r. tytleri, first described by Thomas Jerdon in 1864, and named after the British soldier, naturalist and photographer Robert Christopher Tytler, has deep orange-red underparts and an incomplete breast band. The tail is also longer. It breeds in central Siberia south to northern Mongolia and winters from eastern Bengal east to Thailand and Malaysia.
- H. r. saturata, described by Ridgway in 1883, breeds eastern Siberia; winters to southeastern Asia.
- H. r. mandschurica, described by Meise in 1934, breeds northeastern China; winters to southeastern Asia
- H. r. erythrogaster, the North American subspecies described by Pieter Boddaert in 1783, differs from the European subspecies in having redder underparts and a narrower, often incomplete, blue breast band. It breeds throughout North America, from Alaska to southern Mexico, and migrates to the Lesser Antilles, Costa Rica, Panama and South America to winter. A few may winter in the southernmost parts of the breeding range. This subspecies funnels through Central America on a narrow front and is therefore abundant on passage in the lowlands of both coasts. Since about 1980, small but increasing numbers of this subspecies have been found nesting in Argentina.

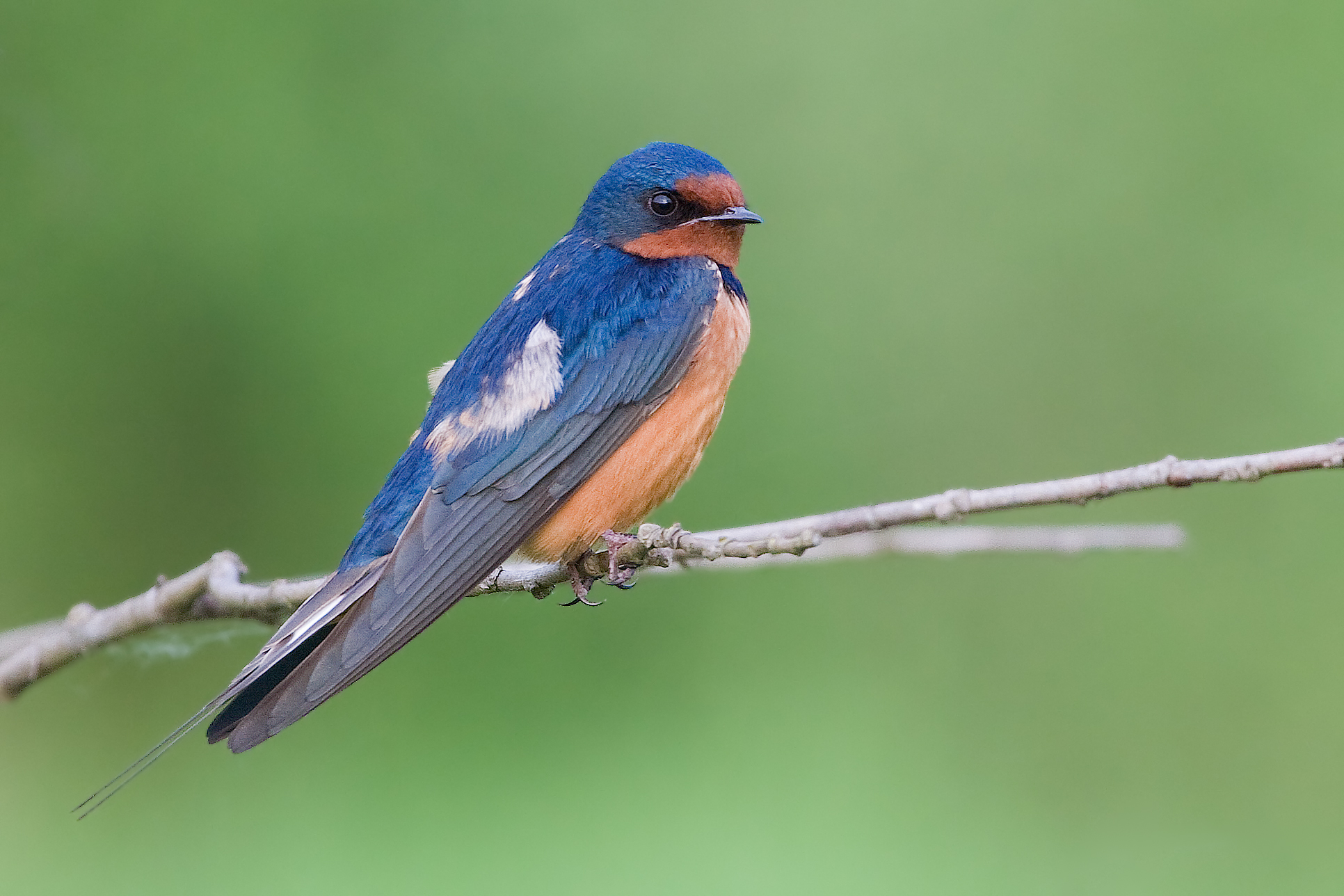
H. r. erythrogaster resting on a twig in Washington State, US

The short wings, red belly and incomplete breast band of H. r. tytleri are also found in H. r. erythrogaster, and DNA analyses show that barn swallows from North America colonised the Baikal region of Siberia, a dispersal direction opposite to that for most changes in distribution between North America and Eurasia.

== Behaviour ==
=== Habitat and range ===
The preferred habitat of the barn swallow is open country with low vegetation, such as pasture, meadows and farmland, preferably with nearby water. This swallow avoids heavily wooded or precipitous areas and densely built-up locations. The presence of accessible open structures such as barns, stables, or culverts to provide nesting sites, and exposed locations such as wires, roof ridges or bare branches for perching, are also important in the bird's selection of its breeding range.

Barn swallows are semi-colonial, settling in groups from a single pair to a few dozen pairs, particularly in larger wooden structures housing animals. The same individuals often breed at the same site year after year, although settlement choices have been experimentally shown to be predicted by nest availability rather than any characteristics of available mates. Because it takes around 2 weeks for a pair to build a nest from mud, hair, and other materials, old nests are highly prized.

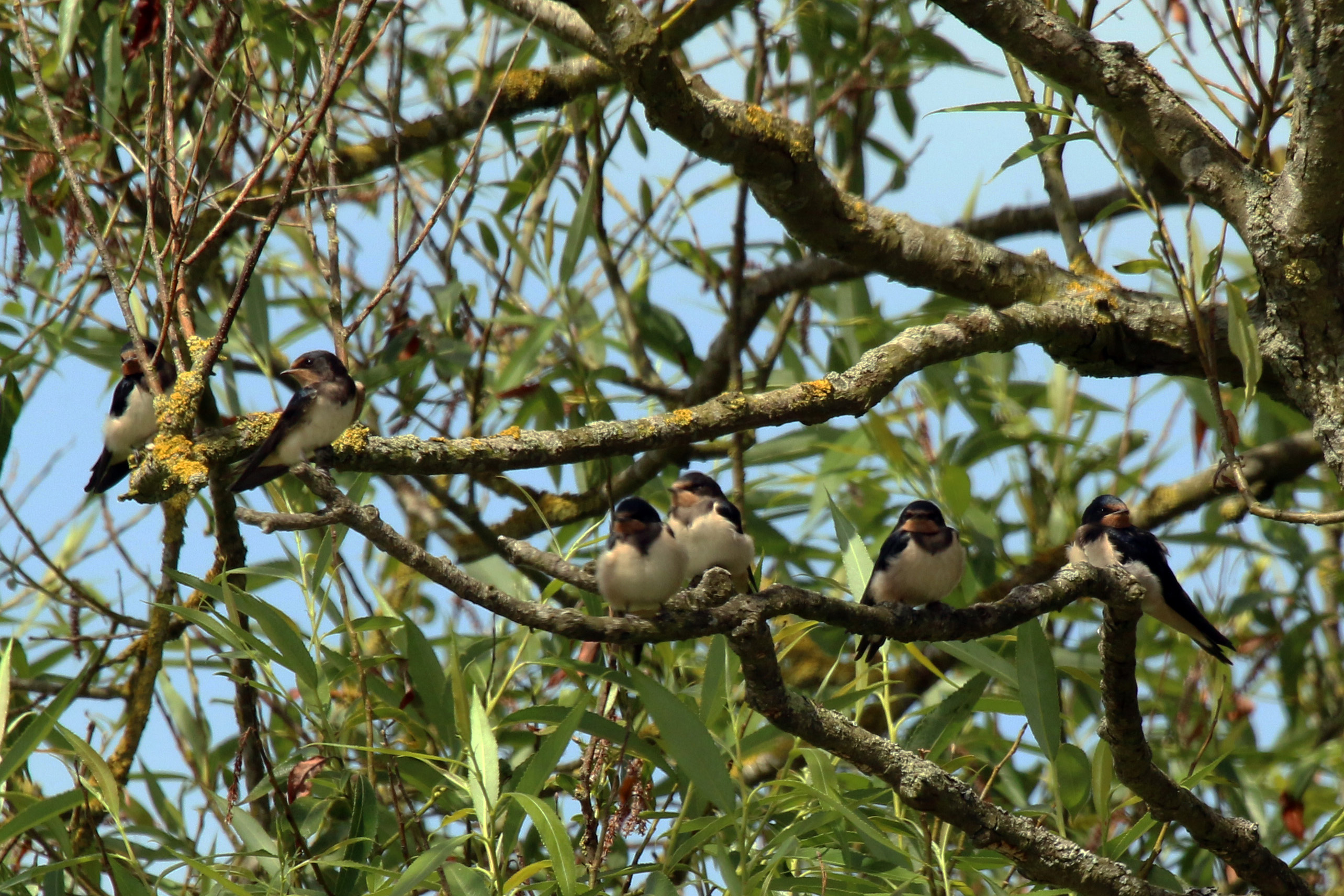
H. r. rustica juveniles

The movement of two swallows in slow motion

This species breeds across the Northern Hemisphere from sea level to 2,700 m (8,900 ft), but to 3,000 m (9,800 ft) in the Caucasus and North America, and it is absent only from deserts and the cold northernmost parts of the continents. Over much of its range, it avoids towns, and in Europe is replaced in urban areas by the house martin. However, in Honshū, Japan, the barn swallow is a more urban bird, with the red-rumped swallow (Cecropis daurica) replacing it as the rural species.

In winter, the barn swallow is cosmopolitan in its choice of habitat, avoiding only dense forests and deserts. It is most common in open, low vegetation habitats, such as savanna and ranch land, and in Venezuela, South Africa and Trinidad and Tobago it is described as being particularly attracted to burnt or harvested sugarcane fields and the waste from the cane. In the absence of suitable roost sites, they may sometimes roost on wires where they are more exposed to predators. Individual birds tend to return to the same wintering locality each year and congregate from a large area to roost in reed beds. These roosts can be extremely large; one in Nigeria had an estimated 1.5 million birds. These roosts are thought to be a protection from predators, and the arrival of roosting birds is synchronised in order to overwhelm predators like African hobbies. The barn swallow has been recorded as breeding in the more temperate parts of its winter range, such as the mountains of Thailand and in central Argentina.

Migration of barn swallows between Britain and South Africa was first established on 23 December 1912 when a bird that had been ringed by James Masefield at a nest in Staffordshire, was found in Natal. As would be expected for a long-distance migrant, this bird has occurred as a vagrant to such distant areas as Hawaii, Bermuda, Greenland, Tristan da Cunha, the Falkland Islands, and even Antarctica.

=== Feeding ===
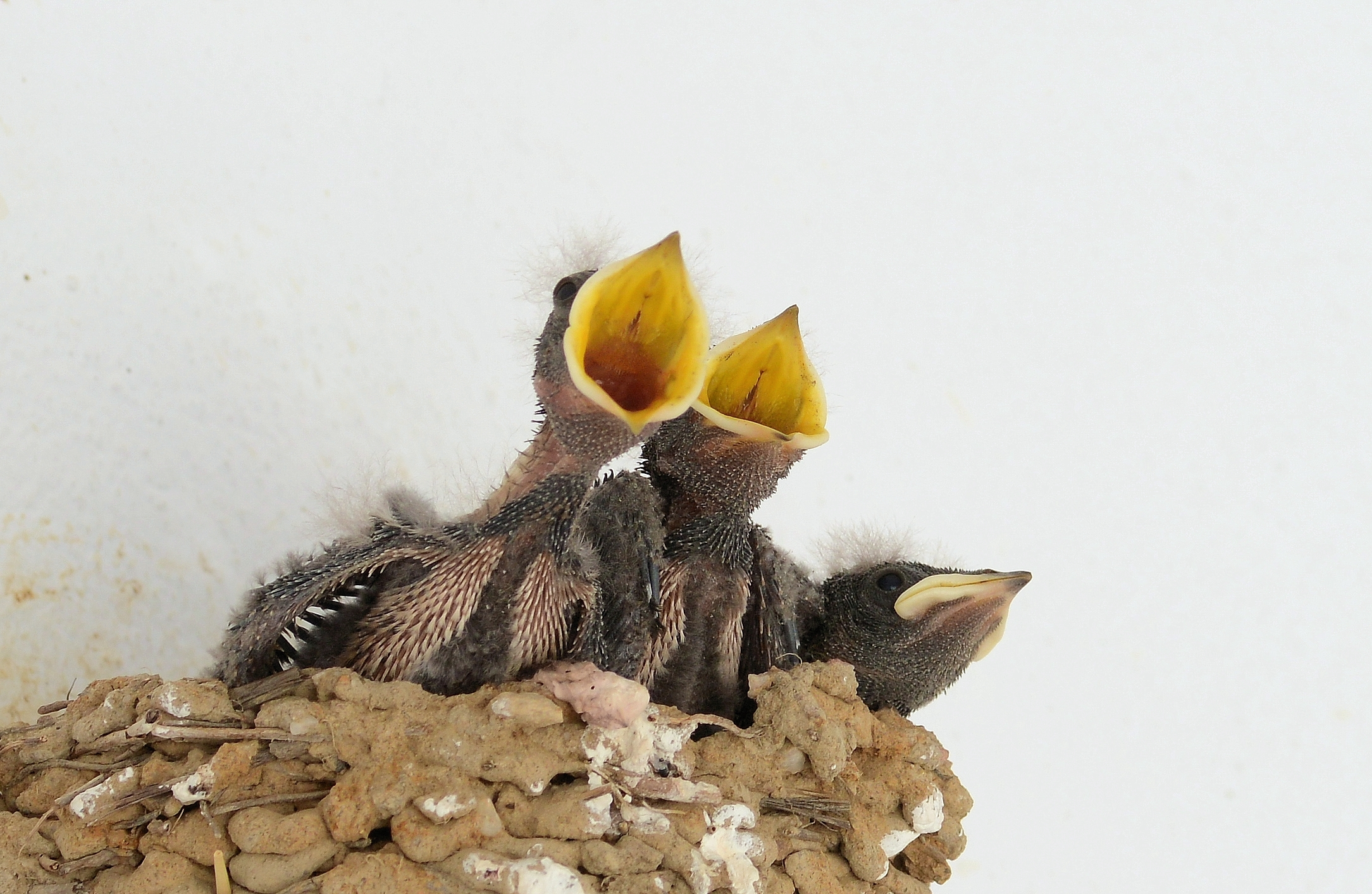
Chicks in the nest

The barn swallow is similar in its habits to other aerial insectivores, including other swallow species and the unrelated swifts. It is not a particularly fast flier, with a speed estimated at 11 m/s (40 km/h), up to 20 m/s (72 km/h) and a wing beat rate of approximately 5, up to 7–9 times each second.

The barn swallow typically feeds in open areas 7–8 m (23–26 ft) above shallow water or the ground often following animals, humans or farm machinery to catch disturbed insects, but it will occasionally pick prey items from the water surface, walls and plants. Swallows have been observed feeding on insects that fly around active white stork nests as well. In the breeding areas, large flies make up around 70% of the diet, with aphids also a significant component. However, in Europe, the barn swallow consumes fewer aphids than the house or sand martins. On the wintering grounds, Hymenoptera, especially flying ants, are important food items. Grasshoppers, crickets, dragonflies, beetles and moths are also preyed upon. When egg-laying, barn swallows hunt in pairs, but otherwise will form often large flocks.

The amount of food a clutch will get depends on the size of the clutch, with larger clutches getting more food on average. The timing of a clutch also determines the food given; later broods get food that is smaller in size compared to earlier broods. This is because larger insects are too far away from the nest to be profitable in terms of energy expenditure.

Isotope studies have shown that wintering populations may utilise different feeding habitats, with British breeders feeding mostly over grassland, whereas Swiss birds utilised woodland more. Another study showed that a single population breeding in Denmark actually wintered in two separate areas.

The barn swallow drinks by skimming low over lakes or rivers and scooping up water with its open mouth. This bird bathes in a similar fashion, dipping into the water for an instant while in flight.

Swallows gather in communal roosts after breeding, sometimes thousands strong. Reed beds are regularly favoured, with the birds swirling en masse before swooping low over the reeds. Reed beds are an important source of food prior to and whilst on migration; although the barn swallow is a diurnal migrant that can feed on the wing whilst it travels low over ground or water, the reed beds enable fat deposits to be established or replenished.

=== Song ===
Males sing to defend small territories (when living in colonies, less so in solitary pairs) and to attract mates. Males sing throughout the breeding season, from late April into August in many parts of the range. Their song is made up of a "twitter warble," followed by a rising "P-syllable" in European H. r. rustica and the North American H. r. erythrogaster. In all subspecies, this is followed by a short "Q-syllable" and a trilled series of pulses, termed the "rattle." The rattle is sometimes followed by a terminal "Ω-Note" in some subspecies' populations, and always at the end of H. r. tytleri song.

Female songs are much shorter than male songs, and are only produced during the early part of the breeding season. Females sing spontaneously, though infrequently, and will also countersing in response to each other.

=== Breeding ===
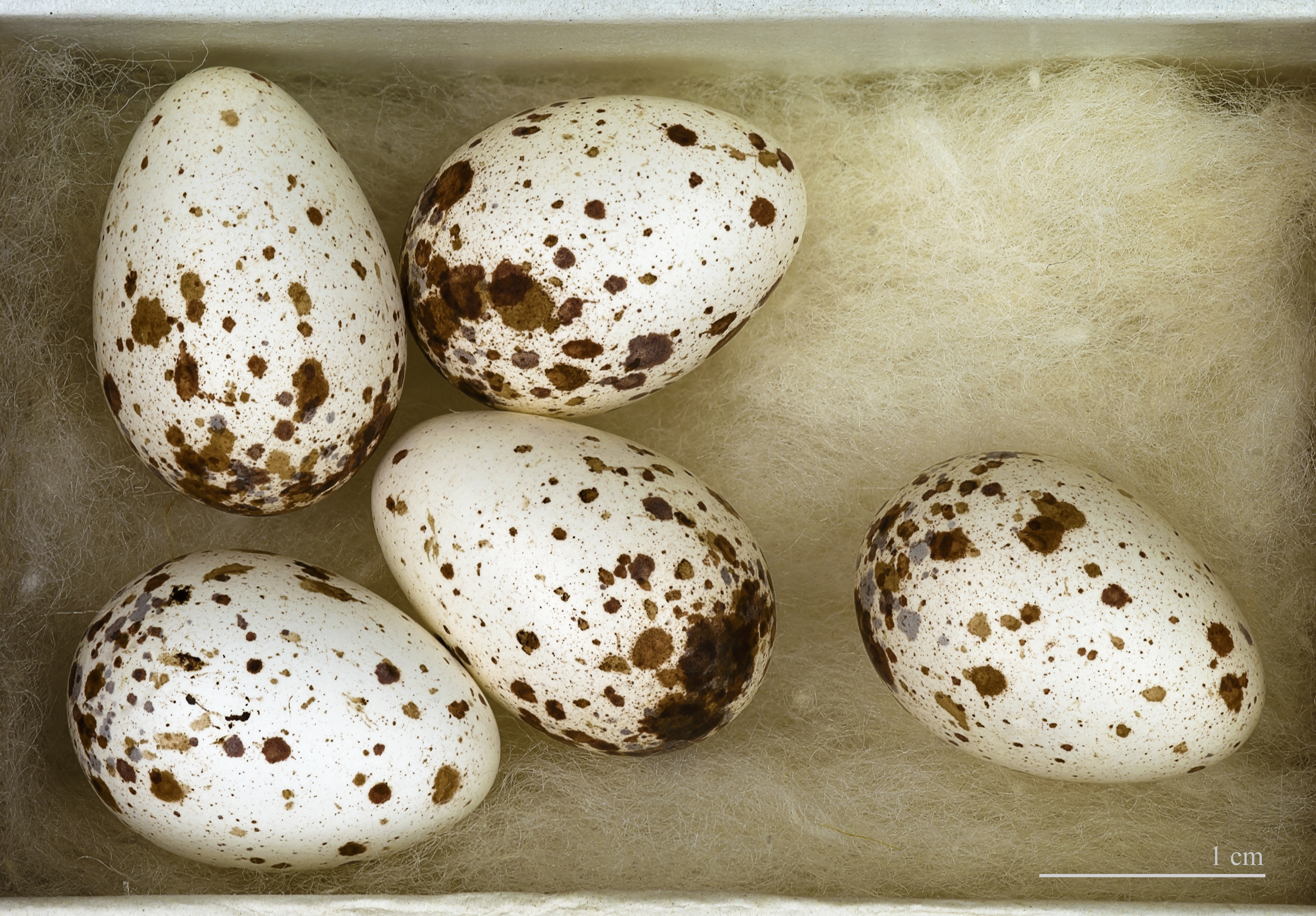
Swallow eggs, hatched

The male barn swallow returns to the breeding grounds before the females and selects a nest site, which is then advertised to females with a circling flight and song. Plumage may be used to advertise: in some populations, like in the subspecies H. r. gutturalis, darker ventral plumage in males is associated with higher breeding success. In other populations, the breeding success of the male is related to the length of the tail streamers, with longer streamers being more attractive to the female. Males with longer tail feathers are generally longer-lived and more disease resistant, females thus gaining an indirect fitness benefit from this form of selection, since longer tail feathers indicate a genetically stronger individual which will produce offspring with enhanced vitality. Males in northern Europe have longer tails than those further south, whereas in Spain the male's tail streamers are only 5% longer than the female's; in Finland, the difference is 20%. In Denmark, the average male tail length increased by 9% between 1984 and 2004, but it is possible that climatic changes may lead in the future to shorter tails if summers become hot and dry.

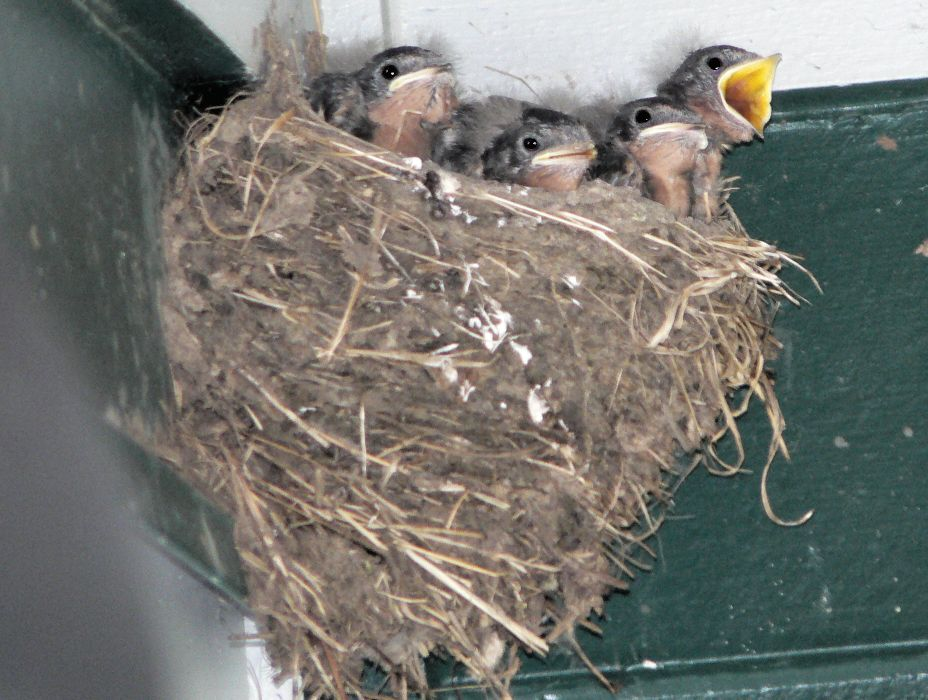
Older chicks in nest

Males with long streamers also have larger white tail spots, and since feather-eating bird lice prefer white feathers, large white tail spots without parasite damage again demonstrate breeding quality; a positive association exists between spot size and the number of offspring produced each season.

The breeding season of the barn swallow is variable: in the southern part of the range, the breeding season usually is from February or March to early to mid September, although some late second and third broods finish in October. In the northern part of the range, it usually starts late May to early June and ends the same time as the breeding season of the southernmost birds.

Both sexes defend the nest, but the male is particularly aggressive and territorial. Once established, pairs stay together to breed for life, but extra-pair copulation is common, making this species genetically polygamous, despite being socially monogamous. Males guard females actively to avoid being cuckolded. Males may use deceptive alarm calls to disrupt extrapair copulation attempts toward their mates.

As its name implies, the barn swallow typically nests inside accessible buildings such as barns and stables, or under bridges and wharves. Before man-made sites became common, it nested on cliff faces or in caves, but this is now rare. The neat cup-shaped nest is placed on a beam or against a suitable vertical projection. It is constructed by both sexes, although more often by the female, with mud pellets collected in their beaks and lined with grasses, feathers, algae or other soft materials. The nest building ability of the male is also sexually selected; females will lay more eggs and at an earlier date with males who are better at nest construction, with the opposite being true with males that are not. After building the nest, barn swallows may nest colonially where sufficient high-quality nest sites are available, and within a colony, each pair defends a territory around the nest which, for the European subspecies, is 4 to 8 m^{2} (40 to 90 sq ft) in size. Colony size tends to be larger in North America.

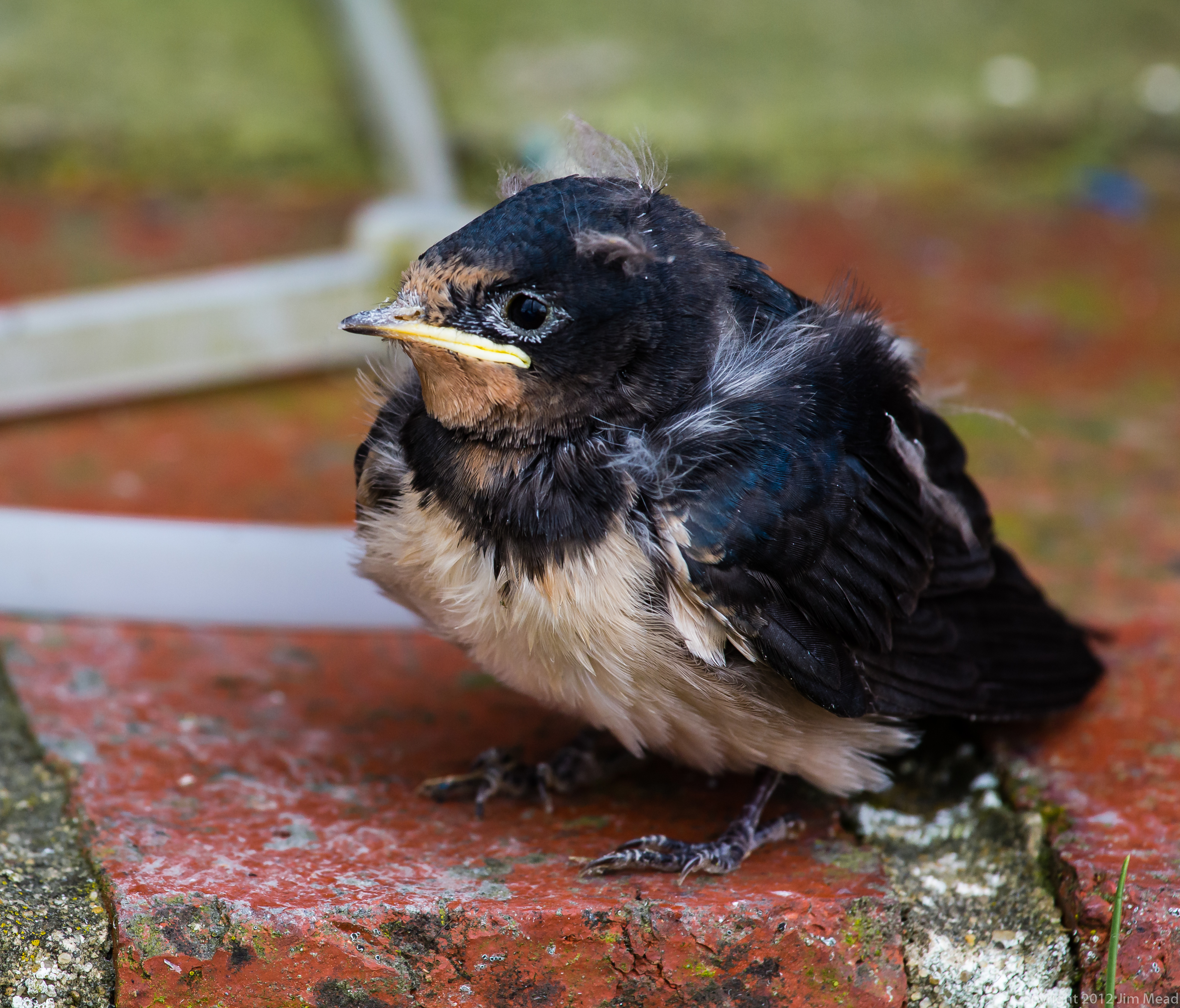
A juvenile swallow on a red brick in Sussex

In North America at least, barn swallows frequently engage in a mutualist relationship with ospreys. Barn swallows will build their nest below an osprey nest, receiving protection from other birds of prey that are repelled by the exclusively fish-eating ospreys. The ospreys are alerted to the presence of these predators by the alarm calls of the swallows.

Barn swallows will normally raise two broods, with the original nest being reused for the second brood and being repaired and reused in subsequent years. The female lays two to seven, but typically four or five, reddish-spotted white eggs. The clutch size is influenced by latitude, with clutch sizes of northern populations being higher on average than southern populations. The eggs are 20 mm × 14 mm (3/4 in × 1/2 in) in size, and weigh 1.9 grams (29 grains), of which 5% is shell. In Europe, the female does almost all the incubation, but in North America the male may incubate up to 25% of the time. The incubation period is normally 14–19 days, with another 18–23 days before the altricial chicks fledge. The fledged young stay with, and are fed by, the parents for about a week after leaving the nest. Occasionally, first-year birds from the first brood will assist in feeding the second brood. Compared to those from early broods, juvenile barn swallows from late broods have been found to migrate at a younger age, fuel less efficiently during migration and have lower return rates the following year.

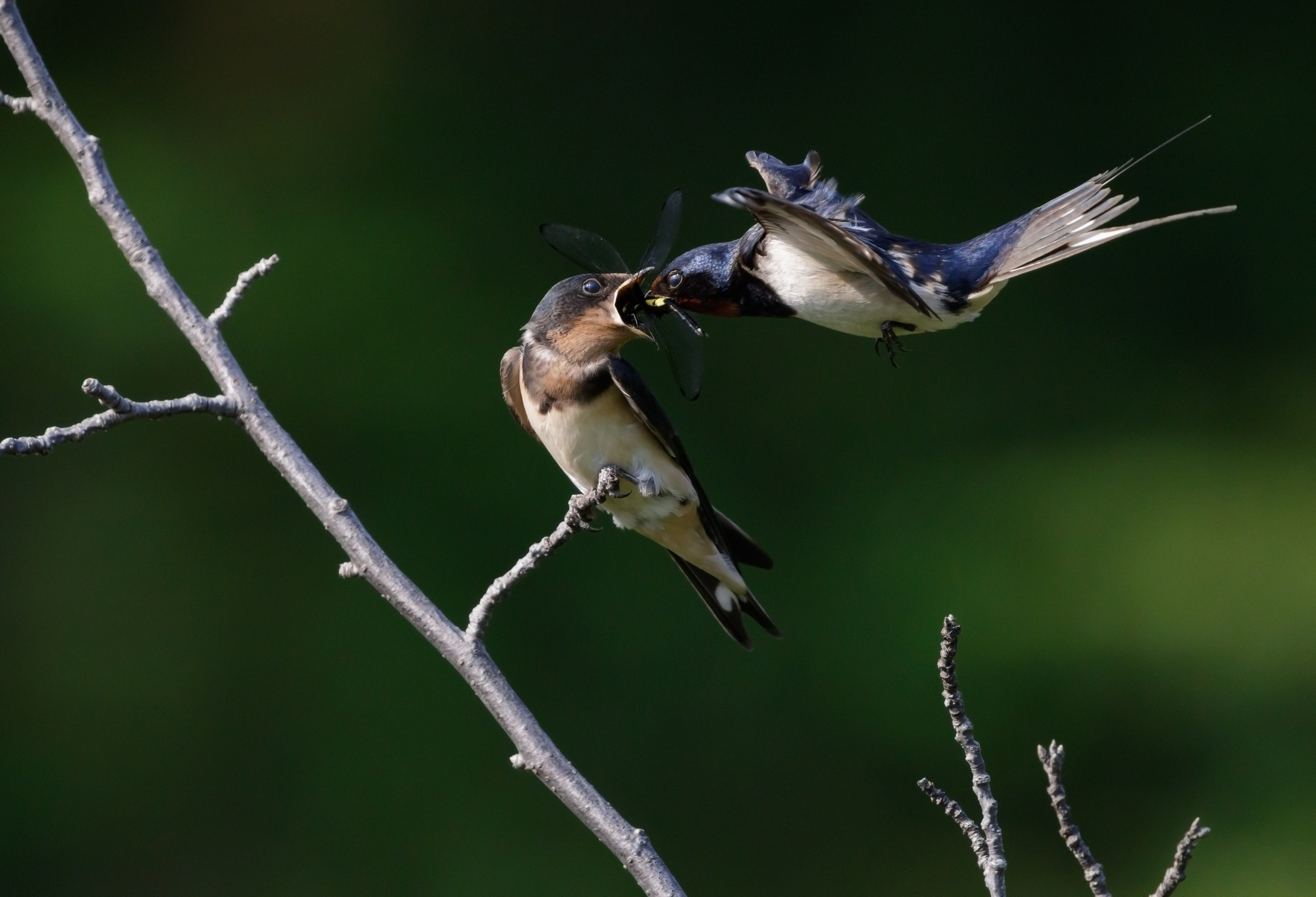
Juvenile being fed

The barn swallow will mob intruders such as cats or accipiters that venture too close to their nest, often flying very close to the threat. Adult barn swallows have few predators, but some are taken by accipiters, falcons, and owls. Brood parasitism by cowbirds in North America or cuckoos in Eurasia is rare.

Hatching success is 90% and the fledging survival rate is 70–90%. Average mortality is 70–80% in the first year and 40–70% for the adult. Although the record age is more than 11 years, most survive less than four years. Barn swallow nestlings have prominent red gapes, a feature shown to induce feeding by parent birds. An experiment in manipulating brood size and immune system showed the vividness of the gape was positively correlated with T-cell–mediated immunocompetence, and that larger brood size and injection with an antigen led to a less vivid gape.

The barn swallow has been recorded as hybridising with the cliff swallow (Petrochelidon pyrrhonota) and the cave swallow (P. fulva) in North America, and the house martin (Delichon urbicum) in Eurasia, the cross with the latter being one of the most common passerine hybrids.

== Parasites and predators ==
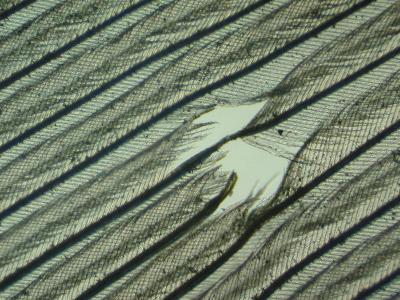
Feeding trace of Brueelia lice on a tail feather

Barn swallows (and other small passerines) often have characteristic feather holes on their wing and tail feathers. These holes were suggested as being caused by avian lice such as Machaerilaemus malleus and Myrsidea rustica, although other studies suggest that they are mainly caused by species of Brueelia. Several other species of lice have been described from barn swallow hosts, including Brueelia domestica and Philopterus microsomaticus. The avian lice prefer to feed on white tail spots, and they are generally found more numerously on short-tailed males, indicating the function of unbroken white tail spots as a measure of quality. In Texas, the swallow bug (Oeciacus vicarius), which is common on species such as the cliff swallow, is also known to infest barn swallows.

Predatory bats such as the greater false vampire bat are known to prey on barn swallows. Swallows at their communal roosts attract predators and several falcon species make use of these opportunities. Falcon species confirmed as predators include the peregrine falcon and the African hobby. In Africa, tigerfish Hydrocynus vittatus have been recorded to routinely leap out of the water to capture low-flying swallows.

== Status ==
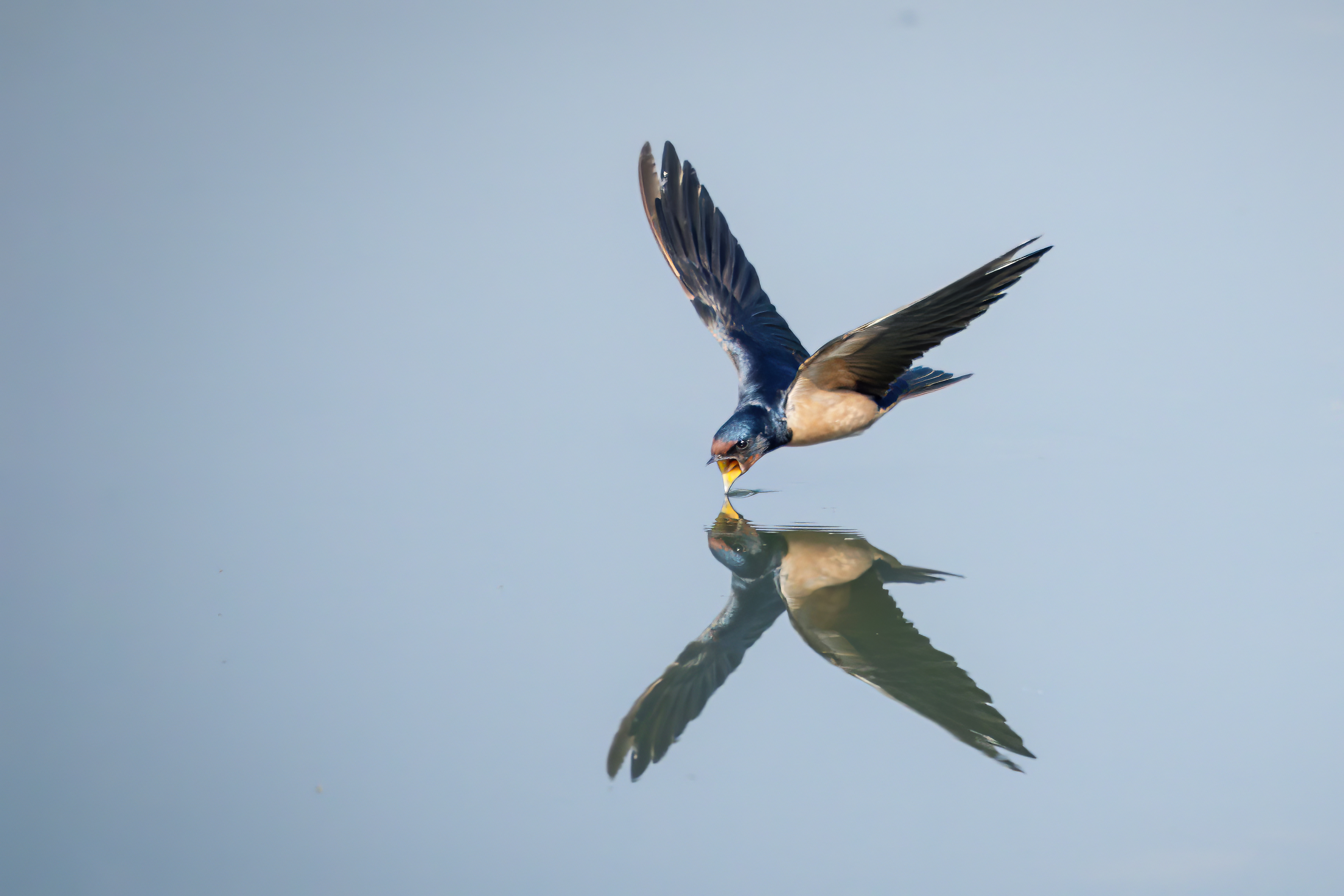
Barn swallow at the moment when its beak touches the water to have a drink in Bagmati River, Nepal

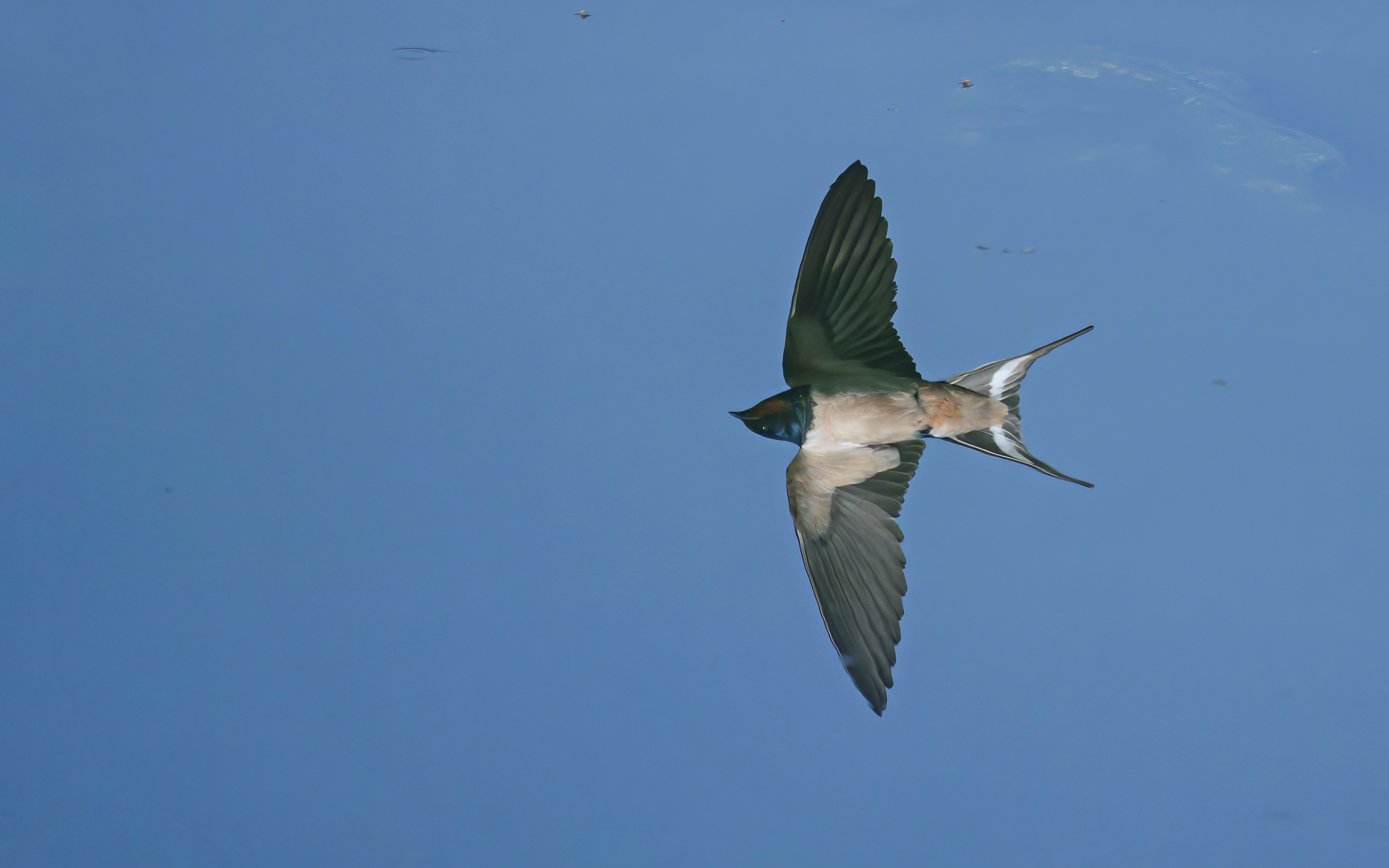
A reflection flight of barn swallow

The barn swallow has an enormous range, with an estimated global extent of about 250,000,000 km^{2} (97,000,000 sq mi) and a population of 190 million individuals. The species is evaluated as least concern on the 2019 IUCN Red List, and has no special status under the Convention on International Trade in Endangered Species of Wild Fauna and Flora (CITES), which regulates international trade in specimens of wild animals and plants.

This is a species that has greatly benefited historically from forest clearance, which has created the open habitats it prefers, and from human habitation, which have given it an abundance of safe man-made nest sites. There have been local declines due to the use of DDT in Israel in the 1950s, competition for nest sites with house sparrows in the US in the 19th century, and an ongoing gradual decline in numbers in parts of Europe and Asia due to agricultural intensification, reducing the availability of insect food. However, there has been an increase in the population in North America during the 20th century with the greater availability of nesting sites and subsequent range expansion, including the colonisation of northern Alberta.

A specific threat to wintering birds from the European populations is the transformation by the South African government of a light aircraft runway near Durban into an international airport for the 2010 FIFA World Cup. The roughly 250 m (270 yd) square Mount Moreland reed bed is a night roost for more than three million barn swallows, which represent 1% of the global population and 8% of the European breeding population. The reed bed lies on the flight path of aircraft using the proposed La Mercy airport, and there were fears that it would be cleared because the birds could threaten aircraft safety. However, following detailed evaluation, advanced radar technology will be installed to enable planes using the airport to be warned of bird movements and, if necessary, take appropriate measures to avoid the flocks.

Climate change may affect the barn swallow; drought causes weight loss and slow feather regrowth, and the expansion of the Sahara will make it a more formidable obstacle for migrating European birds. Hot dry summers will reduce the availability of insect food for chicks. Conversely, warmer springs may lengthen the breeding season and result in more chicks, and the opportunity to use nest sites outside buildings in the north of the range might also lead to more offspring.

== Relationship with humans ==
The barn swallow is an attractive bird that feeds on flying insects and has therefore been tolerated by humans when it shares their buildings for nesting. As one of the earlier migrants, this conspicuous species is also seen as an early sign of summer's approach.

In the Old World, the barn swallow appears to have used man-made structures and bridges since time immemorial. An early reference is in Virgil's Georgics (29 BC), "Ante garrula quam tignis nidum suspendat hirundo" (Before the twittering swallow hangs its nest from the rafters).

Many cattle farmers believed that swallows spread Salmonella infections; however, a study in Sweden showed no evidence of the birds being reservoirs of the bacteria.

=== In literature ===
Many literary references are based on the barn swallow's northward migration as a symbol of spring or summer. The proverb about the necessity for more than one piece of evidence goes back at least to Aristotle's Nicomachean Ethics: "For as one swallow or one day does not make a spring, so one day or a short time does not make a fortunate or happy man."

The barn swallow symbolises the coming of spring and thus love in the Pervigilium Veneris, a late Latin poem. In his poem "The Waste Land", T. S. Eliot quoted the line "Quando fiam uti chelidon [ut tacere desinam]?" ("When will I be like the swallow, so that I can stop being silent?") This refers to the myth of Philomela in which she turns into a nightingale, and her sister Procne into a swallow.

=== In culture ===
Gilbert White studied the barn swallow in detail in his pioneering work The Natural History of Selborne, but even this careful observer was uncertain whether it migrated or hibernated in winter. Elsewhere, its long journeys were well observed, and a swallow tattoo is traditional among sailors as a symbol of a safe return; the tradition was that a mariner had a tattoo of this fellow wanderer after sailing 5,000 nautical miles (9,300 kilometres). A second swallow would be added after 10,000 nmi (19,000 km) at sea.

In the past, the tolerance for this beneficial insectivore was reinforced by superstitions regarding damage to the barn swallow's nest. Such an act might lead to cows giving bloody milk, or no milk at all, or to hens ceasing to lay. This may be a factor in the longevity of swallows' nests. Survival, with suitable annual refurbishment, for 10–15 years is regular, and one nest was reported to have been occupied for 48 years.

It is depicted as the martlet, merlette or merlot in heraldry, where it represents younger sons who have no lands. It is also represented as lacking feet as this was a common belief at the time. As a result of a campaign by ornithologists, the barn swallow has been the national bird of Estonia since 23 June 1960, and is also the national bird of Austria.

== See also ==
- Swallow migration versus hibernation
