= Machaerilaemus =

Scientific classification
- Domain: Eukaryota
- Kingdom: Animalia
- Phylum: Arthropoda
- Class: Insecta
- Order: Psocodea
- Family: Menoponidae
- Genus: Machaerilaemus; Harrison, 1915

Genus of lice

Machaerilaemus is a genus of lice belonging to the family Menoponidae.

The species of this genus are found in Europe and Northern America.

Selected species:

- Machaerilaemus americanus (Ewing, 1930)
- Machaerilaemus clayae (Balat, 1966)
- Machaerilaemus malleus (Burmeister, 1838)
