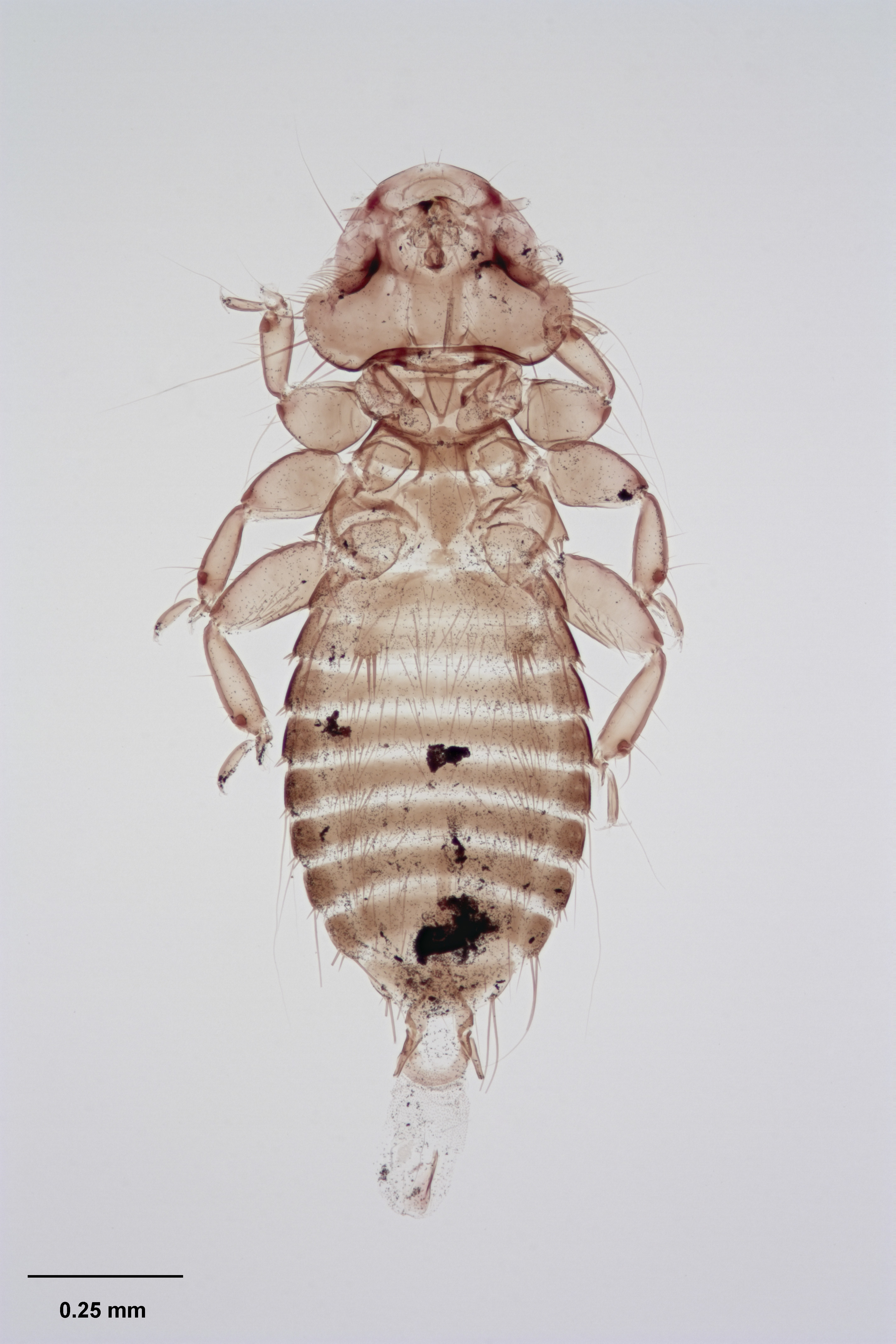
- Myrsidea nesomimi borealis

Scientific classification
- Domain: Eukaryota
- Kingdom: Animalia
- Phylum: Arthropoda
- Class: Insecta
- Order: Psocodea
- Family: Menoponidae
- Genus: Myrsidea; Waterston, 1915

Type species
- Myrsidea victrix Waterston, 1915

= Myrsidea =

Genus of lice

Myrsidea is a genus of lice belonging to the family Menoponidae. The genus has cosmopolitan distribution.

== Species ==
Selected species:

- Myrsidea abhorrens (Zlotorzycka, 1964)
- Myrsidea abidae Ansari, 1956
- Myrsidea rustica (Giebel, 1874)
- Myrsidea victrix Waterston, 1915
