= Machaerilaemus malleus =

Scientific classification
- Kingdom: Animalia
- Phylum: Arthropoda
- Class: Insecta
- Order: Psocodea
- Infraorder: Phthiraptera
- Family: Menoponidae
- Genus: Machaerilaemus
- Species: M. malleus

Binomial name
- Machaerilaemus malleus (Burmeister, 1838)

Species of louse

Machaerilaemus malleus is a species of louse belonging to the family Menoponidae.

Synonyms:

- Eureum malleus Burmeister, 1838
- Machaerilaemus bolivianus Carriker, 1944
