= Myrsidea rustica =

Scientific classification
- Domain: Eukaryota
- Kingdom: Animalia
- Phylum: Arthropoda
- Class: Insecta
- Order: Psocodea
- Family: Menoponidae
- Genus: Myrsidea
- Species: M. rustica

Binomial name
- Myrsidea rustica (Giebel, 1874)

Species of louse

Machaerilaemus malleus is a species of louse belonging to the family Menoponidae.

Synonyms:

- Eureum malleus Burmeister, 1838
- Machaerilaemus bolivianus Carriker, 1944
