= Brueelia =

Scientific classification
- Domain: Eukaryota
- Kingdom: Animalia
- Phylum: Arthropoda
- Class: Insecta
- Order: Psocodea
- Family: Philopteridae
- Genus: Brueelia; Kéler, 1936

Genus of lice

Brueelia (formerly spelled Brüelia) is a genus of bird lice in the family Philopteridae that infest Passerine (perching) birds. Lice in Brueelia are usually host specific, with more than 85% of described species each found on a single host bird species. Over 300 species of Brueelia have been described, and many more specimens that are presumed to belong to Brueelia are awaiting description and naming.

The genus Brueelia includes the following species:

- Brueelia afzali Ansari, 1957
- Brueelia amandavae Rekasi & Saxena, 2005
- Brueelia astrildae Tendeiro & Mendes, 1994
- Brueelia biocellata Piaget, 1880
- Brueelia blagovescenskyi Balát, 1955
- Brueelia breueri Balát, 1955
- Bureelia cantans Sychra, 2010
- Brueelia clayae Ansari, 1956
- Brueelia conocephala Blagoveshtcensky, 1940
- Bureelia deficiens Piaget, 1885
- Brueelia eichleri Lakshminarayana, 1969
- Brueelia fasciata Sychra, 2010
- Brueelia ferianci Balát, 1955
- Brueelia glandari perisoreus Ansari, 1956
- Brueelia glizi Balát, 1955
- Brueelia hopkinsi Ansari, 1956
- Brueelia kluzi Balát, 1955
- Brueelia kratochvilli Balát, 1958
- Brueelia lonchurae Tendeiro & Mendes, 1994
- Brueelia matvejevi Balát, 1981
- Brueelia munia Ansari
- Brueelia pelikani Balát, 1958
- Brueelia plocea Lakshminarayana
- Brueelia rotundata Osborn, 1896
- Brueelia senegala Sychra, 2010
- Brueelia stenozona (Kellogg & Shapman, 1902)
- Brueelia rosickyi Balát, 1955
- Brueelia rossitensis Kéler, 1936
- Brueelia vaneki Balát, 1981
