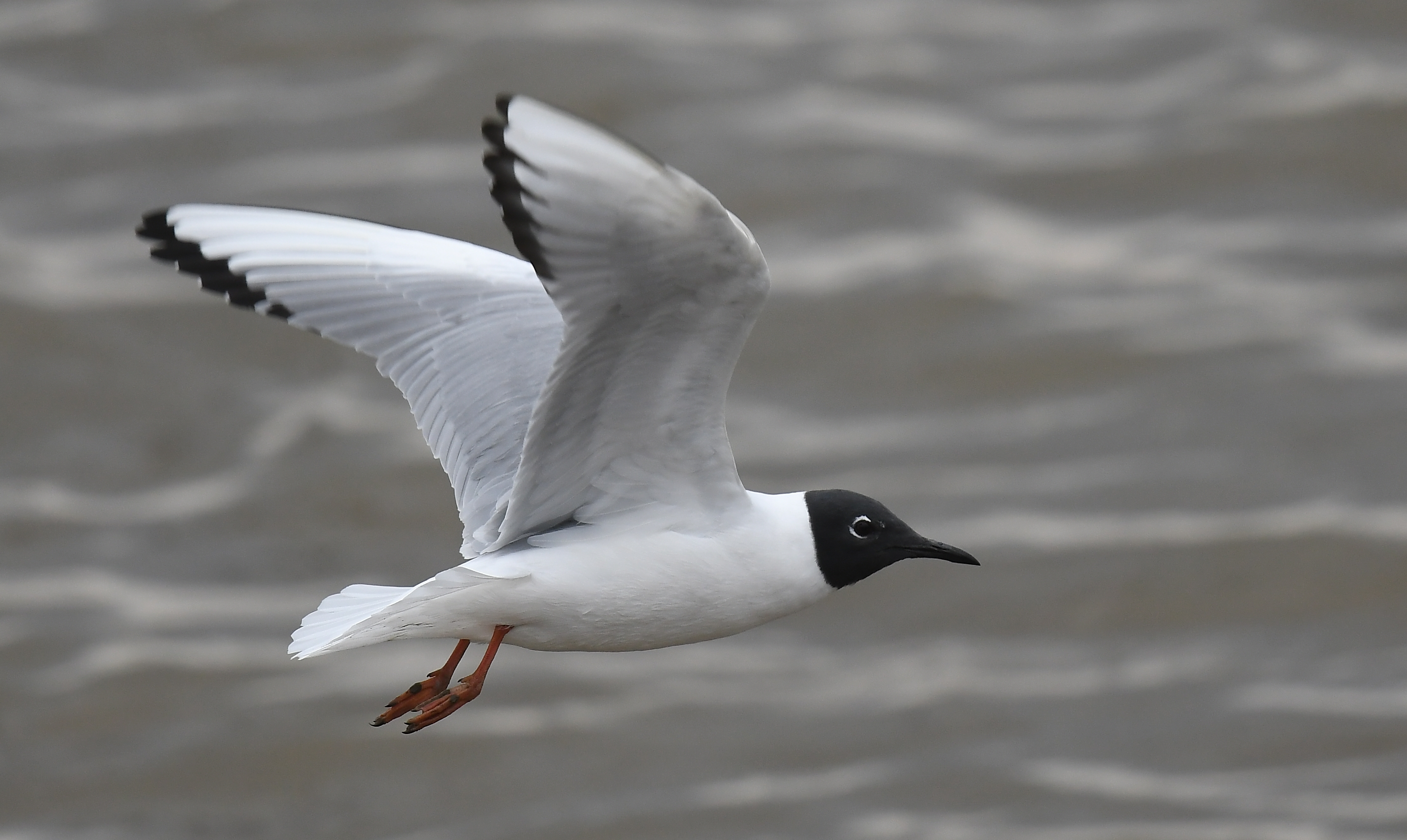
- Adult with breeding plumage
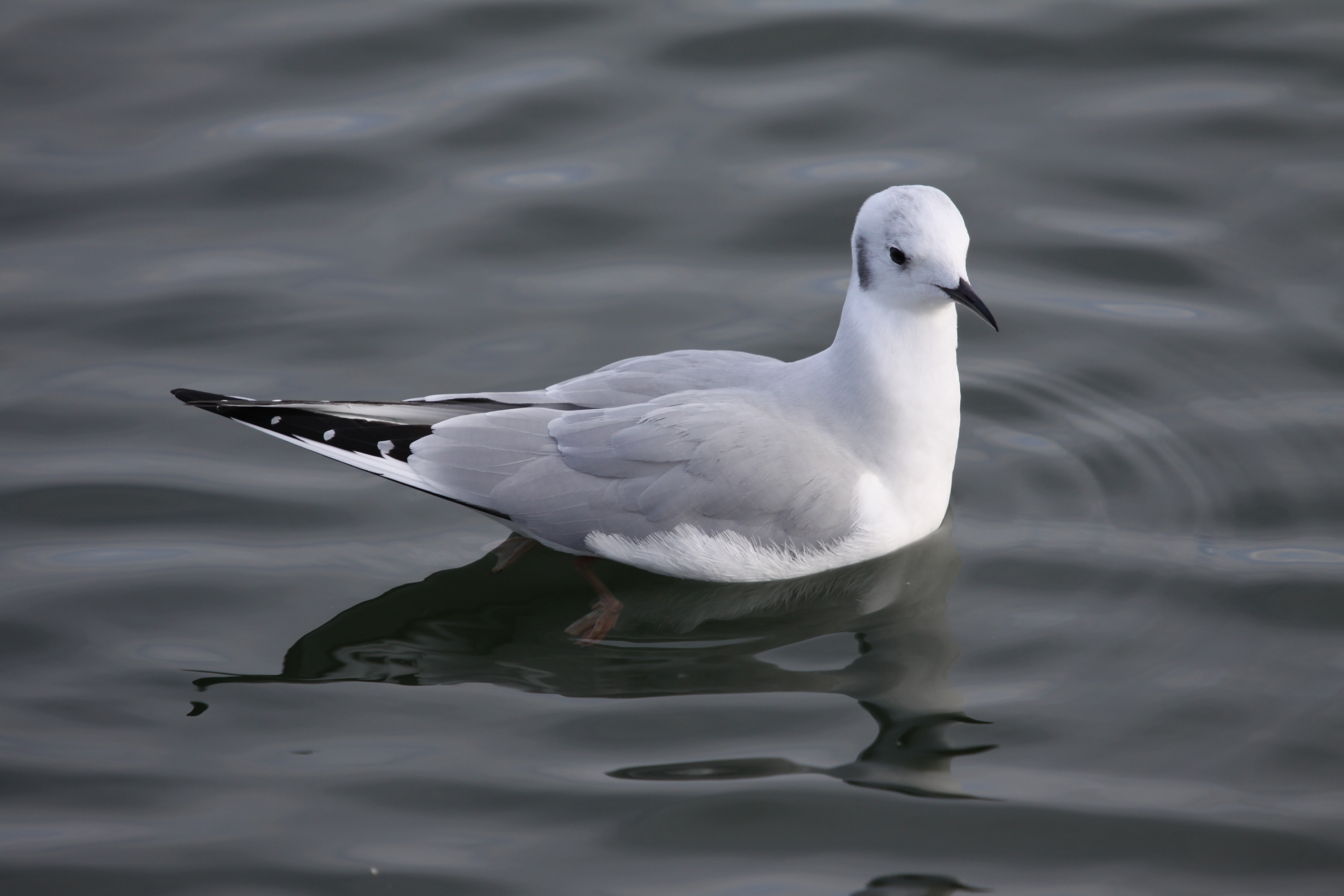
- Adult with non-breeding plumage

Conservation status
- Least Concern (IUCN 3.1)

Scientific classification
- Kingdom: Animalia
- Phylum: Chordata
- Class: Aves
- Order: Charadriiformes
- Family: Laridae
- Genus: Chroicocephalus
- Species: C. philadelphia

Binomial name
- Chroicocephalus philadelphia (Ord, 1815)
- The range map of Chroicocephalus philadelphia Breeding Migration Non-breeding

Synonyms
- Larus philadelphia; Sterna philadelphia Ord, 1815; Larus bonapartei Rich. & Sw., 1831

= Bonaparte's gull =

Species of bird

Bonaparte's gull (Chroicocephalus philadelphia) is a gull found mainly in northern North America. At 28 to 38 cm (11 to 15 in) in length, it is one of the smallest species of gull. Its plumage is mainly white with grey upperparts. During breeding season, Bonaparte's gull gains a slaty-black hood. The sexes are similar in appearance.

== Taxonomy and etymology ==
When George Ord first described Bonaparte's gull in 1815, he gave it the scientific name Sterna philadelphia, and the English name 'Banded-tail Tern'; the description clearly identifies it as a bird in first-winter plumage, while "The slender and tern-like form of the bill probably induced Mr. Ord to put it in Sterna". Most later taxonomists assigned it to the genus Larus, a longtime catch-all for most of the gull species. However, in 1858, George Newbold Lawrence moved the species to the genus Chroicocephalus, and some taxonomists followed suit. Subsequent molecular DNA studies have shown that this species fits neatly into a clade with other Chroicocephalus "hooded" gulls, and that it is in a close-to-basal position in that grouping. Based on these studies, the American Ornithologists' Union, which had previously assigned the species to the genus Larus, restored it to Chroicocephalus in 2008. It is monotypic across its range.

The species is named after Charles Lucien Bonaparte, a French ornithologist (and nephew to the former French emperor Napoleon Bonaparte) who spent eight years in America, contributing to the understanding of the taxonomy and nomenclature of birds there and elsewhere. Its genus name, Chroicocephalus, is a combination of the Greek words chroikos, an adjective form of chroa meaning "colour", and kephalē meaning "head". This refers to the dark heads that most gulls in this genus show during the breeding season. The specific epithet philadelphia is a Latinized adjective meaning "from Philadelphia", a reference to the location from which the type specimen was collected.

== Description ==
Bonaparte's gull is among the smallest of the gull species; only little gull and Saunders's gull are smaller. Adults range from 28 to 38 cm (11 to 15 in) in length, with a wingspan of 76–84 cm (30–33 in) and a weight of 180–225 g (6.3–7.9 oz). There is no difference in plumage or bare part colour between the sexes, though males tend to be heavier than females. Bonaparte's gull is smaller-bodied, smaller-headed, and smaller-billed than the other common hooded gulls of North America. The adult has grey upperparts and white underparts, with, unlike other Chroicocephalus gulls, the grey extending up the rear of the neck to just below the head; its wingtips are black and white striped above with the outer four primary feathers white with a black tip, and the other primary feathers grey with a black tip; the whole wing is very pale below. In breeding plumage, it has a slaty black hood, which it loses in non-breeding plumage. Its short, thin bill is black, and its legs are pinkish-red in winter, orangish-red in summer.

The juvenile plumage, usually only seen on the breeding grounds, is scalloped brown on the back, and patchy brown on the head; they moult into first-winter plumage in August mostly before migrating south. First year birds are more like the adults with a grey back, but retain a brown bar across the forewing, blackish tips to the secondary feathers, and a black tip to the tail; they have the same plumage in winter and the following summer, but the summer plumage is paler due to wear and fading. Fewer than 5 percent of Bonaparte's gulls acquire a dark hood in their first summer, and on those that do, the hood is duller than on breeding adults. Two-year old birds mostly gain full adult plumage, but a few retain signs of immaturity such as brown spots on the forewing and dark tips to some of the tail feathers.

The most similar potential confusion species is the Old World black-headed gull, with each being a regular, though scarce or rare, winter visitor within the wintering range of the other. They can best be distinguished by the smaller size of Bonaparte's gull, its slenderer, darker bill, pale grey rear of the neck, pinker legs, and in flight, by the conspicuously whiter underwing, lacking the dark uderside of the primary feathers of black-headed gull. Little gull can also be confused in immature plumages; it is even smaller than Bonaparte's gull, and the dark bar on the forewing of year-old birds is black, not dark brown. Adult little gulls, with their uniform pale grey upperwing and blackish underwing, are far less likely to be confused.

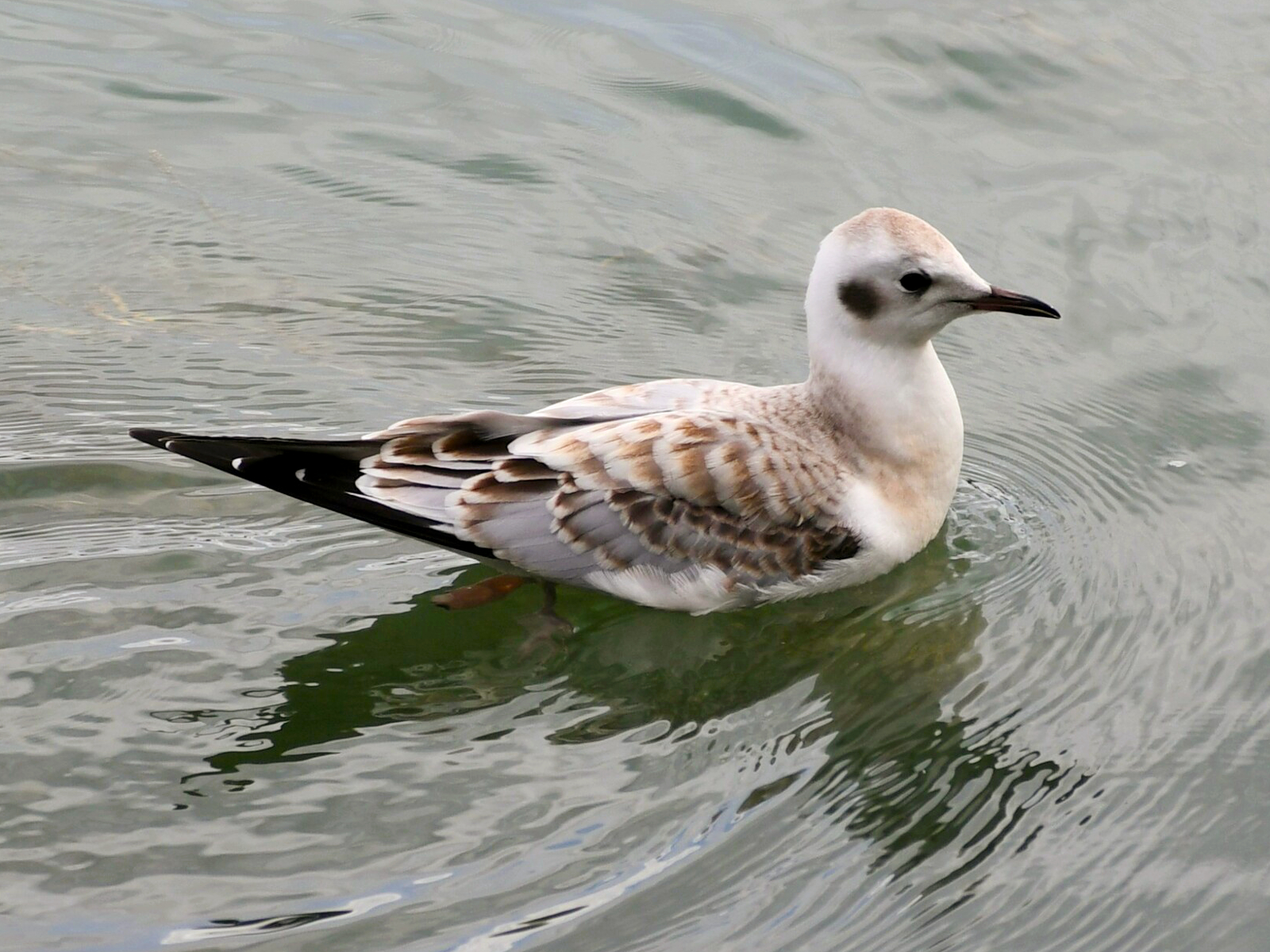
juvenile plumage; Whitehorse, Yukon

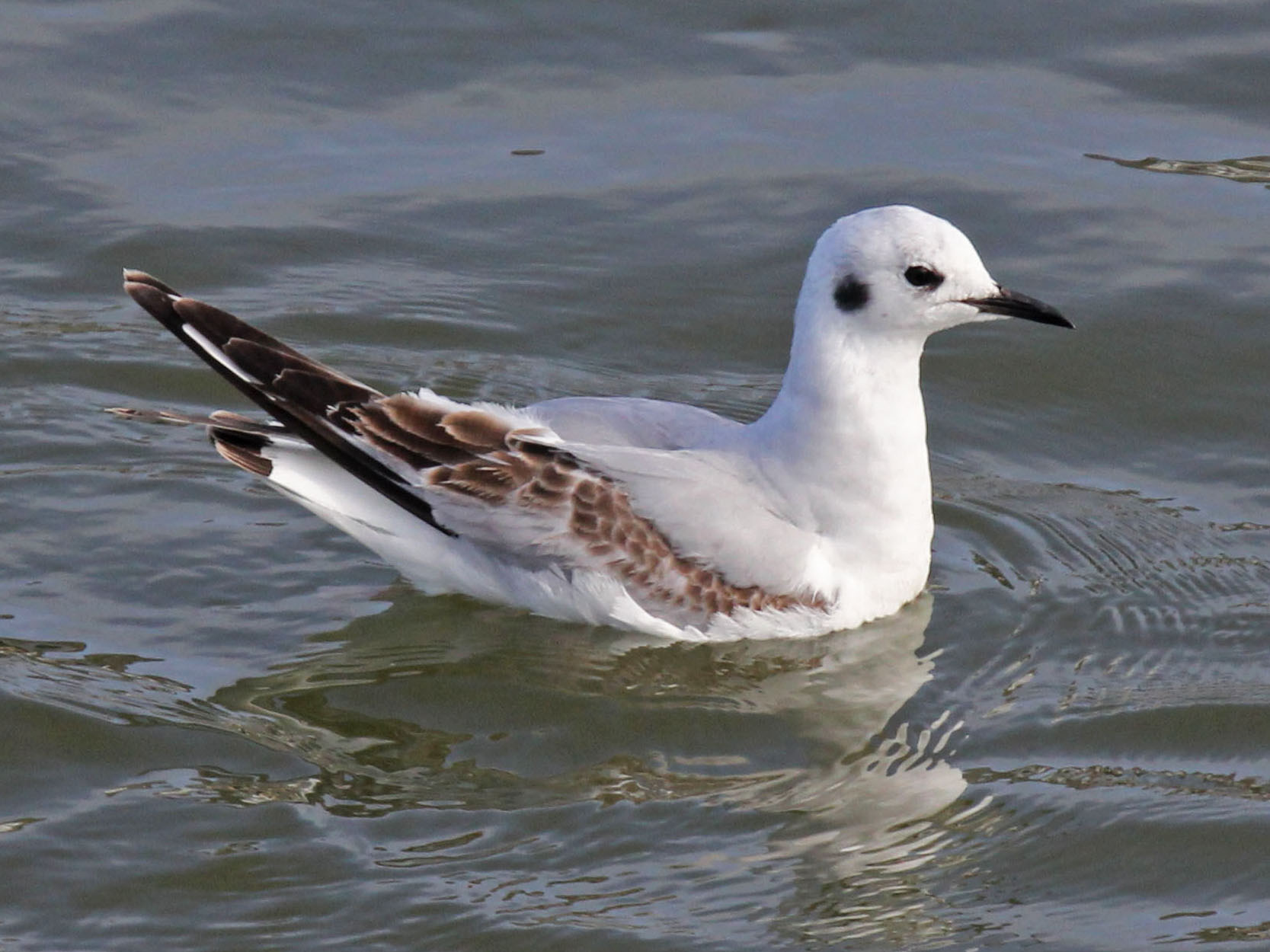
immature (first-winter) plumage, showing the tail band and brown wing pattern

immature, Tofino, Vancouver Island

== Distribution and habitat ==
Bonaparte's gull breeds in boreal forest across southern Alaska and much of interior western Canada, as far east as central Quebec and south to within 320 km (200 mi) of the Canada – United States border. It avoids dense stands of conifers, instead choosing more open areas, such as the treed edges of bogs, fens, marshes, ponds, or islands. It typically nests within 60 m (200 ft) of open water. It winters along the coasts of North America, and in the Great Lakes.

=== Vagrancy ===
It is a rare but annual visitor to western Europe and the Azores, where it generally associates with black-headed gulls. In Great Britain, the number of records increased from averages of six per year at the start of the 21st century to around 12 per year by 2018–2022; the reason for this increase is unknown. Individuals often return to particular sites over a number of years; one at Bamburgh in Northumberland returned for its 12th autumn in 2024. In 2017 a breeding pair was found in northwestern Iceland. Bonaparte's gull is an occasional non-breeding vagrant to the Hawaiian Islands, and vagrants have also been recorded west to Japan and south to Brazil and Senegal.

== Behaviour ==
They are migratory and most move southeast or southwest to coastal waters, also the Great Lakes. They are graceful in flight, more like terns than most other gulls.

=== Feeding ===
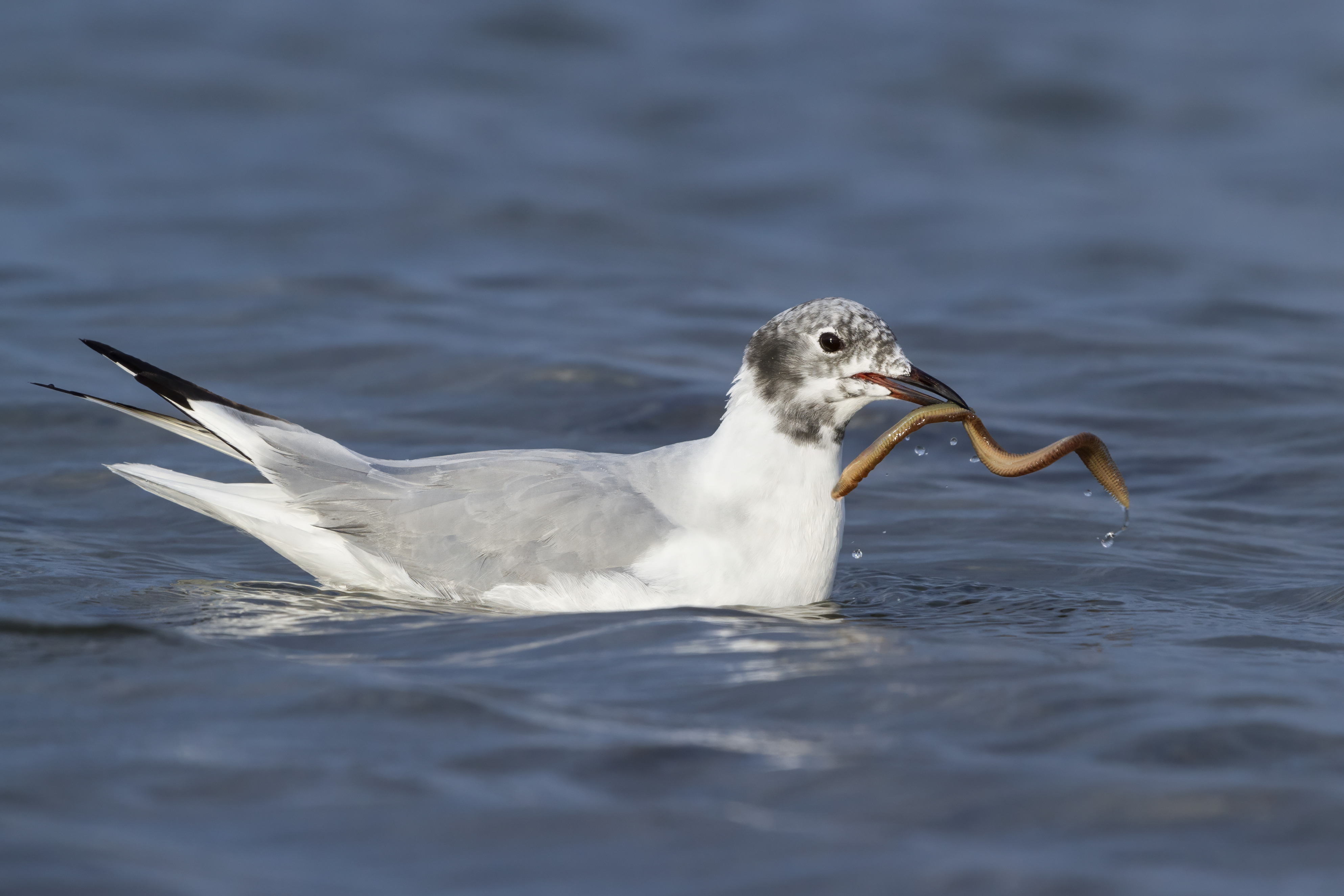
A Bonaparte's Gull eats a sandworm in the Saco Bay, ME.

Like most gulls, Bonaparte's gull has a varied diet, with prey items changing over the course of the year, and from year to year. During the breeding season, it is largely insectivorous. It is known to quickly congregate in large numbers to take advantage of termite dispersal flights, circling over the emerging swarm and hovering briefly to take the insects in flight. It also gathers in large numbers to feed on the eggs of spawning salmon, alighting on the water and, if necessary, diving to take drifting eggs. During migration and into the winter, insects are first supplemented, then replaced by other food items, including fish, small crustaceans, mollusks, euphausiids, marine worms, and other invertebrates. At least one immature bird has been recorded as having fed on walnut meat. Bonaparte's gulls are known to engage in kleptoparasitism, and have been observed stealing earthworms from foraging dunlins and black-bellied plovers.

=== Breeding ===
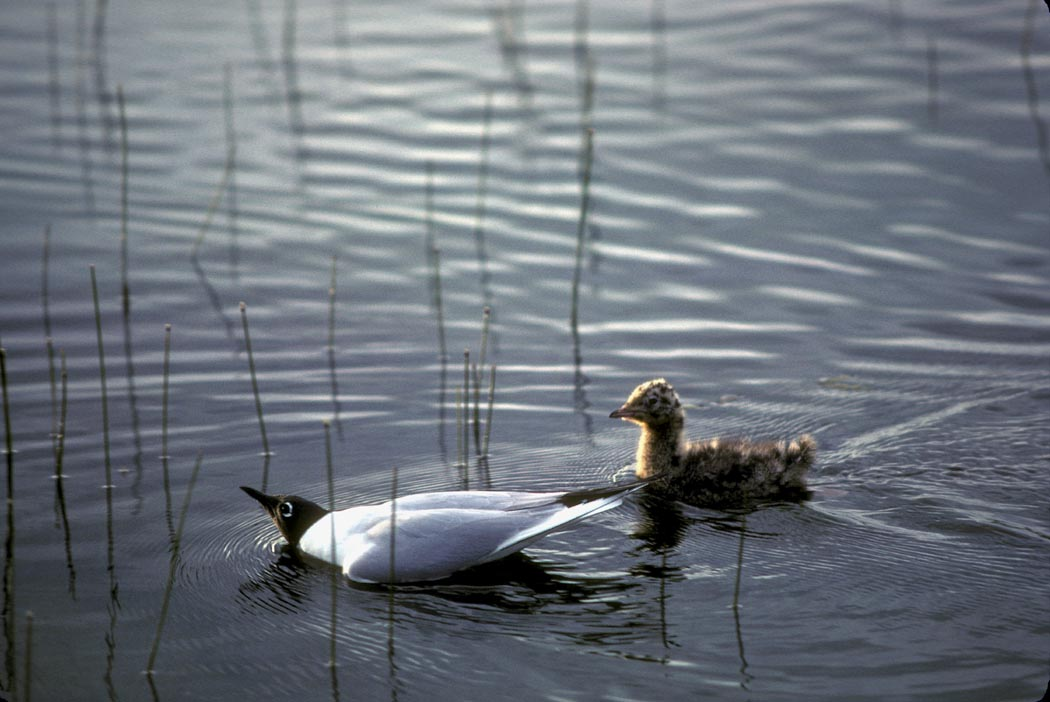
Once they leave the nest, chicks follow their parents to the nearest water.

Bonaparte's gulls begin breeding at two years of age; they are thought to be monogamous. The breeding season begins in mid-June. Courting pairs perform swooping display flights, calling loudly and diving at each other, and then drop down to perch on a branch. Crouched and facing each other, with neck and crown feathers erected and wings slightly raised, they scream at each other with bills opened wide, bobbing up and down as they do so. This display can continue for several minutes before ending abruptly; afterwards, the birds may sit quietly together for some time before separating again.

They raise a single brood per year, nesting singly or in loose colonies of 2–20 pairs, with nests spaced at least 30–50 m (98–164 ft) apart. Unlike most other gulls, Bonaparte's gulls typically nest in trees — almost exclusively conifers, most often black spruce, but also northern whitecedar, tamarack and jack pine. Both sexes help to build the nest, which is a platform of small sticks, sometimes with lichen, moss or marsh vegetation added, measuring about 25 cm (9.8 in) in diameter. Most nests are placed 3–6 m (9.8–19.7 ft) above the ground, and within 60 m (200 ft) of open water, though they have been found low as 1.5 m (4 ft 11 in), as high as 15 m (49 ft), and as far as 180 m (590 ft) from open water. They are only rarely placed on the ground, except in the far north where trees are absent. Adults are aggressive in defending their nests, chasing away even large potential predators such as hawks, common ravens and humans. There is some evidence that human activity in the area of their nests may cause decreased productivity — they are known to travel as far as a kilometre (about a half mile) to mob people, — but, contrarily, some choose to nest near human habitation.

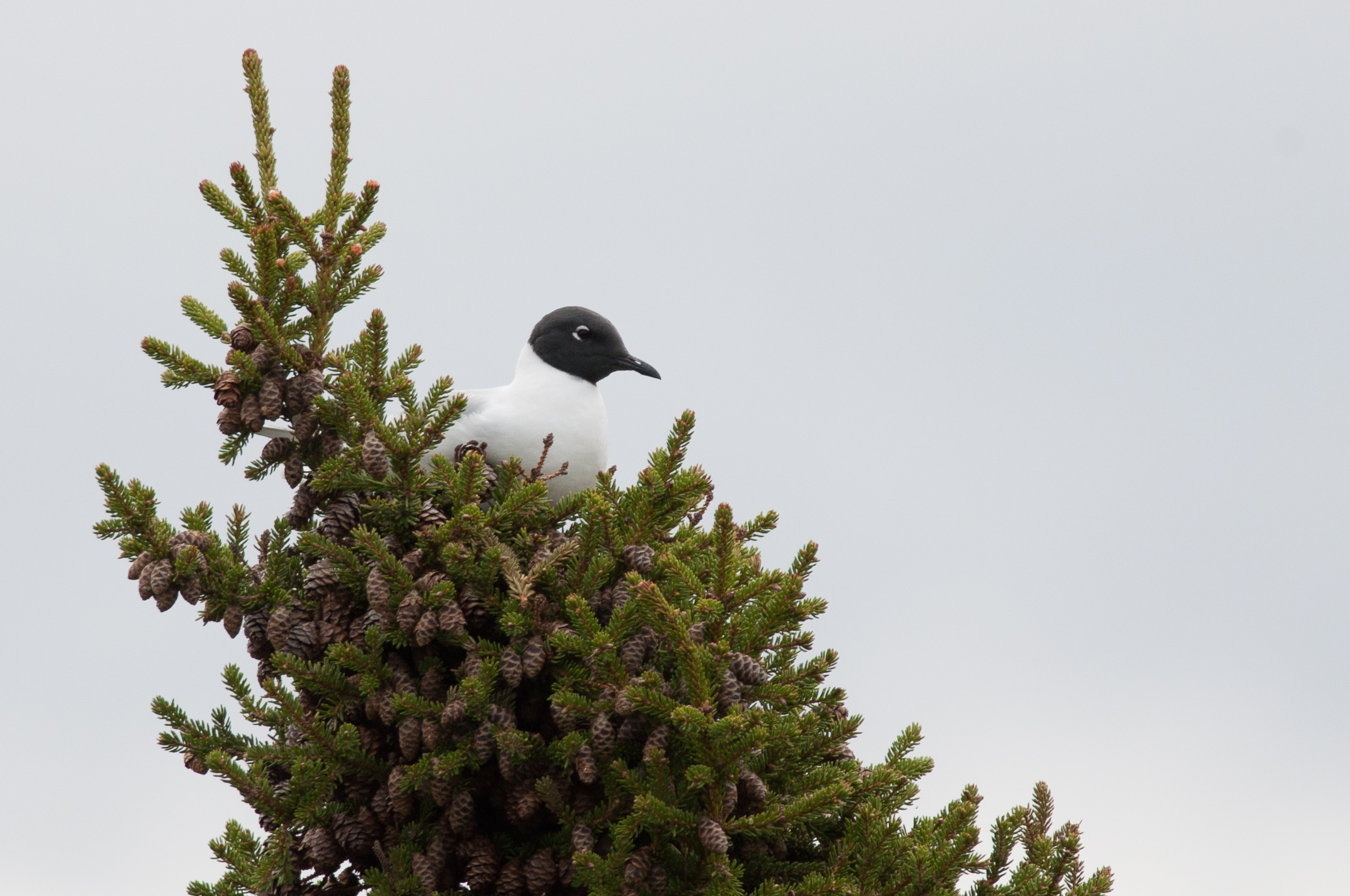
Bonaparte's gull nesting at the top of a black spruce in Churchill, Manitoba

The female lays a clutch of 2–4 eggs, with most nests containing 3 eggs. The eggs are subelliptical, slightly glossy and smooth, measuring 49 mm × 34 mm (1.9 in × 1.3 in) and weighing 28.5 g (1.01 oz). They range in colour from pale to medium green, olive or buff, and may be variably marked with spots, blotches, or scrawls of brown, grey, violet, or black; these markings may be fine and evenly distributed over the entire surface of the egg, or thick and concentrated towards the egg's larger end. The eggs are incubated by both parents for 22–24 days. Studies have shown that breeding populations can be significantly impacted by bad weather. In one multi-year study in Churchill, Manitoba, more than half of the eggs laid in observed nests were blown out of those nests during storms; only 42% of eggs survived to hatching.

Hatchling Bonaparte's gulls are semi-precocial, emerging from their eggs covered with natal down feathers, and with eyes already opened. The down is yellowish-buff, greyer on the flanks and belly, and somewhat pinkish on the breast, with dark brown mottling on the upperparts and head. The bill is blue-black with a pinkish base, and the legs and feet are pinkish-buff. Young birds typically leave the nest within 2–7 days of hatching, jumping out and following their parents to the nearest open water. Both parents tend the young. The time it takes the young to fledge is unknown. Bonaparte's gulls may live to 18 years.

=== Voice ===
Bonaparte's gull
Long Island, NY, April 2004. By Tony Phillips.

Bonaparte's gull has a voice described as nasal and raspy, with calls variously transcribed as cherr or cheeer.

== Conservation ==
Because of its extremely large range and its increasing population, Bonaparte's gull is listed as a species of least concern by the International Union for Conservation of Nature. In North America, it is protected by the Migratory Bird Treaty Act. Because it occurs in Europe and Africa only as a vagrant, it is not protected by the Agreement on the Conservation of African-Eurasian Migratory Waterbirds.

The species is known to be preyed upon by peregrine falcons.

Like many birds, it hosts a number of internal and external parasites. The linguatulid species Reighardia sternae, a tiny, worm-like crustacean, is sometimes found in the gull's air sacs. The acanthocephala worm Corynosoma bipapillum is sometimes found in the bird's posterior gut, as is the intestinal worm Echinostomum spinulosum. Gigantobilharzia lawayi, a schistosome (or blood fluke) may be carried in the capillaries. Externally, it is known to carry several species of lice, including Actornithophilus funebre, Degeeriella atrimarginata, Degeeriella punctata, Menopon species, and Philopterus gonothorax.

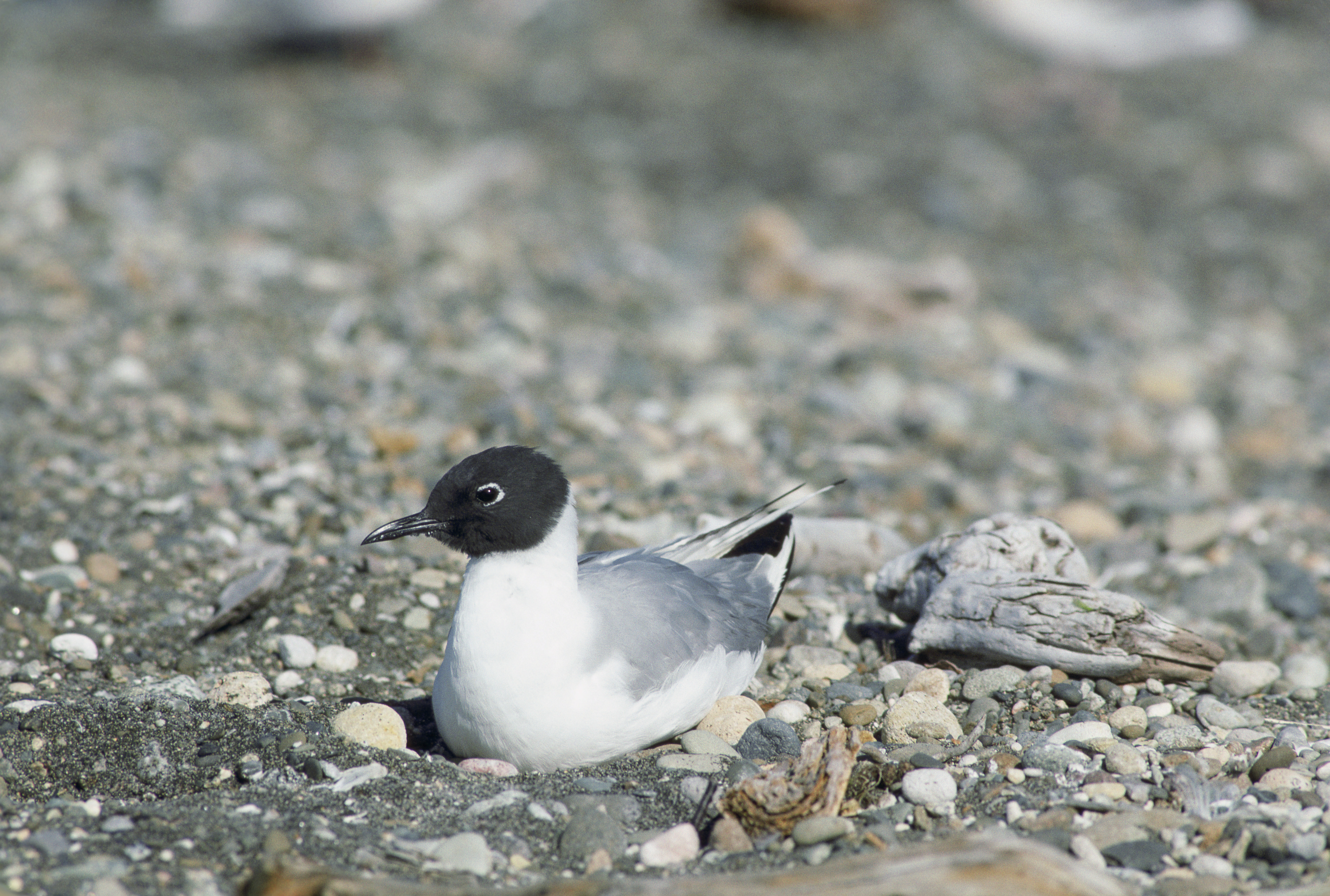
Ground nesting in Katmai National Park, Alaska

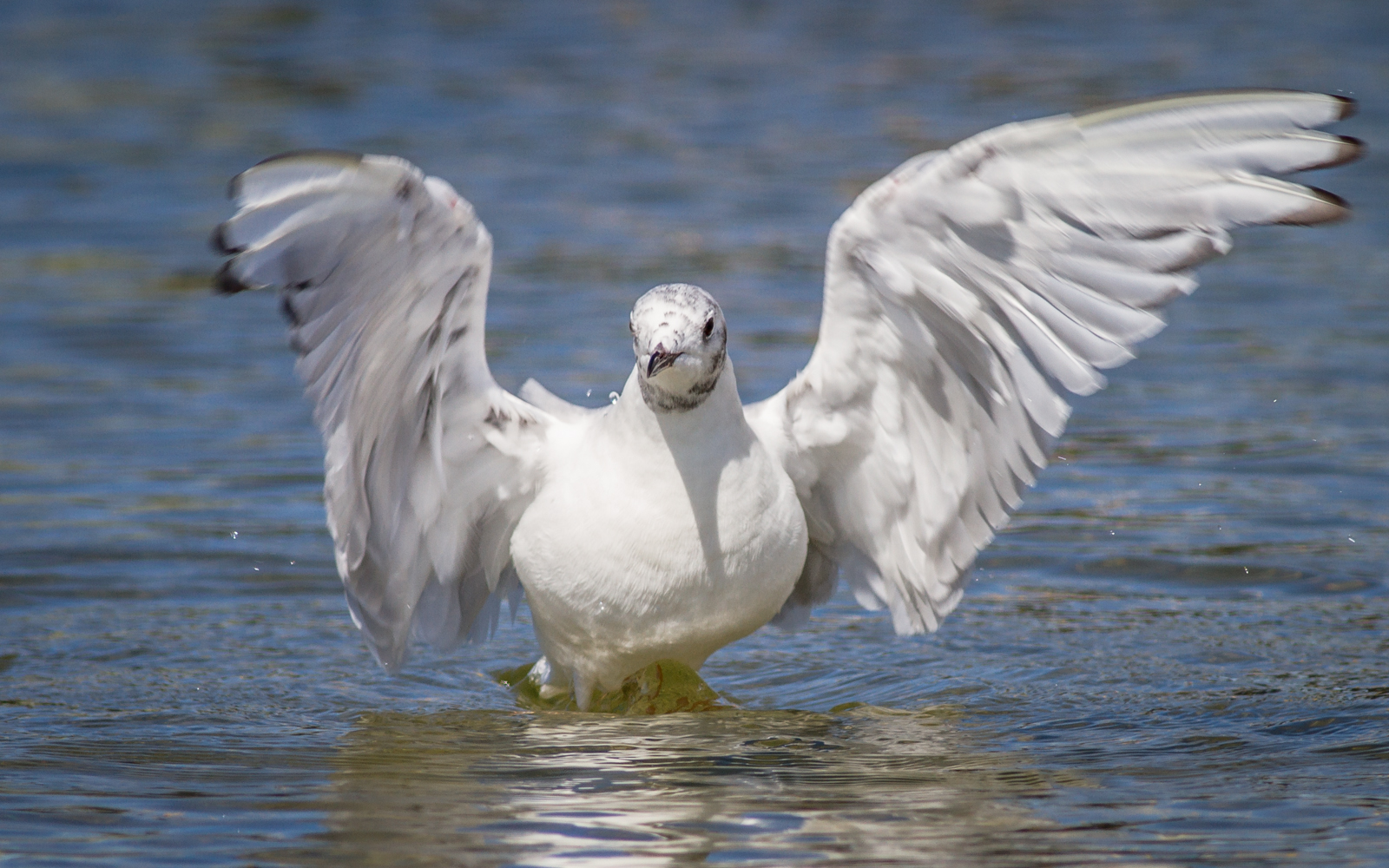
Showing the white underwing

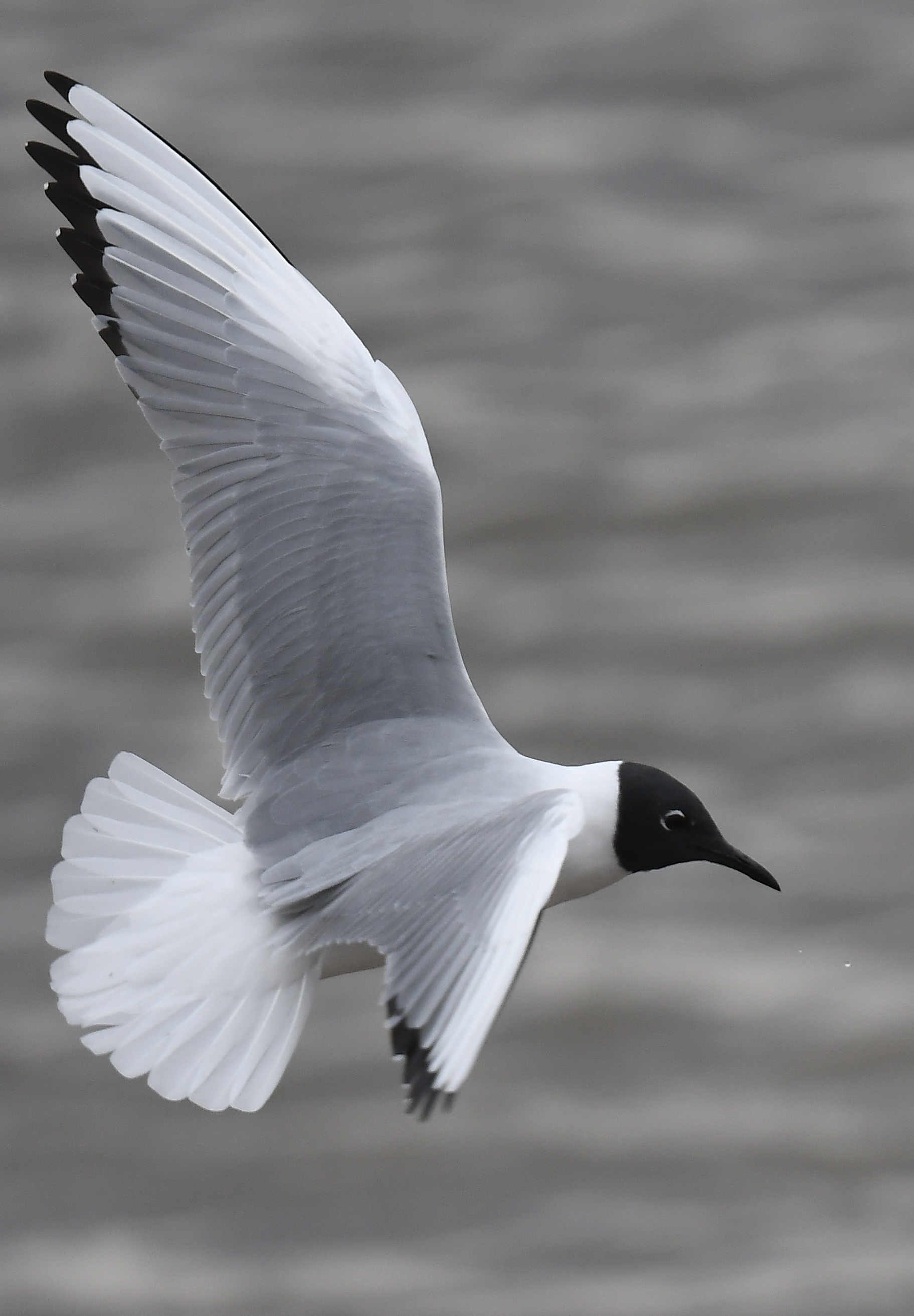
In flight, showing the upperwing pattern

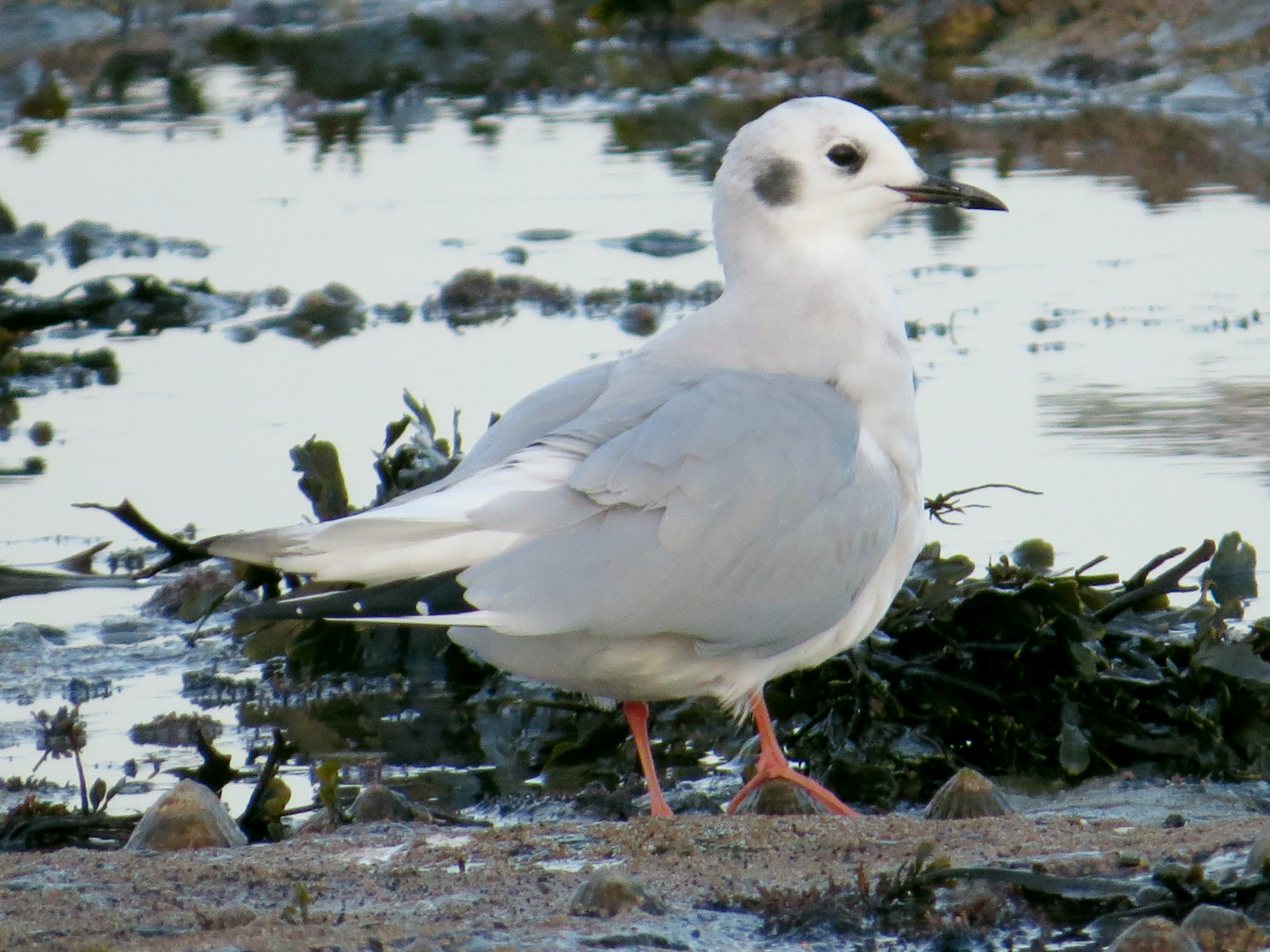
Vagrant in UK
