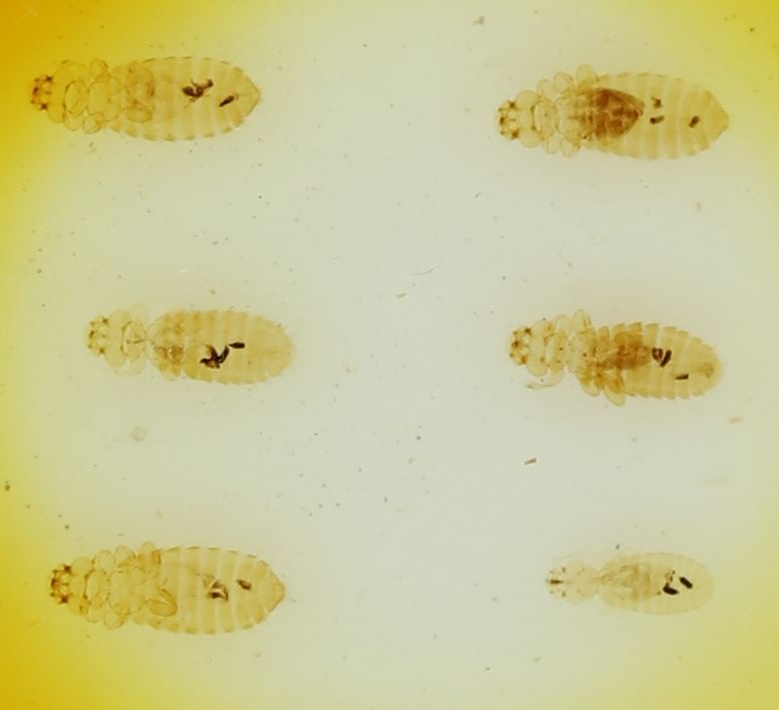
- C. scopinum (2 ♂; 4 ♀)
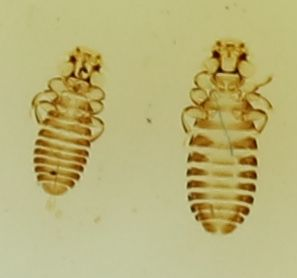
- C. fregili (♀; ♂)

Scientific classification
- Kingdom: Animalia
- Phylum: Arthropoda
- Class: Insecta
- Order: Psocodea
- Infraorder: Phthiraptera
- Family: Menoponidae
- Genus: Colpocephalum; Nitzsch, 1818

Type species
- Colpocephalum zebra Burmeister, 1838

Synonyms
- Ferrisia Uchida, 1926 (not Fullaway, 1923); Neocolpocephalum Ewing, 1933; Corvocolpocephalum Conci, 1942; Liothella Eichler, 1947; Pelecanigogus Eichler, 1949; Galliferrisia Ansari, 1951; And 19 more: Allocolpocephalum Qadri, 1939; Aquiligogus Eichler & Zlotorzycka, 1971; Blagoveshtshenskyella Eichler, 1982; Cariamigogus Eichler, 1952; Dimorphiventer Eichler, 1944; Falcocephalum Tendeiro, 1989; Galligogus Eichler, 1947; Gypsigogus Eichler & Zlotorzycka, 1963; Lanicephalum Zlotorzycka, 1964; Megacolpocephalum Mey, 1999; Picusphilus Ansari, 1951; Pricebeeria Eichler & Zlotorzycka, 1971; Pseudocolpocephalum Qadri, 1936; Ratitiphagus Eichler, 1949; Scalarisoma Kéler, 1939; Scopigogus Eichler, 1952; Talegalligogus Mey, 1982; Tendeiroella Eichler, 1982; Vulturigogus Eichler & Zlotorzycka, 1963

= Colpocephalum =

Genus of lice

Colpocephalum is a genus of chewing louse. Christian Ludwig Nitzsch named the genus in 1818. The Plenary Powers of the International Commission on Zoological Nomenclature selected Colpocephalum zebra Burmeister, 1838 as its type species in the 1950s. There are approximately 135 species in this genus, and they are ectoparasites of birds in at least a dozen different orders.

== Taxonomic history and the type species ==
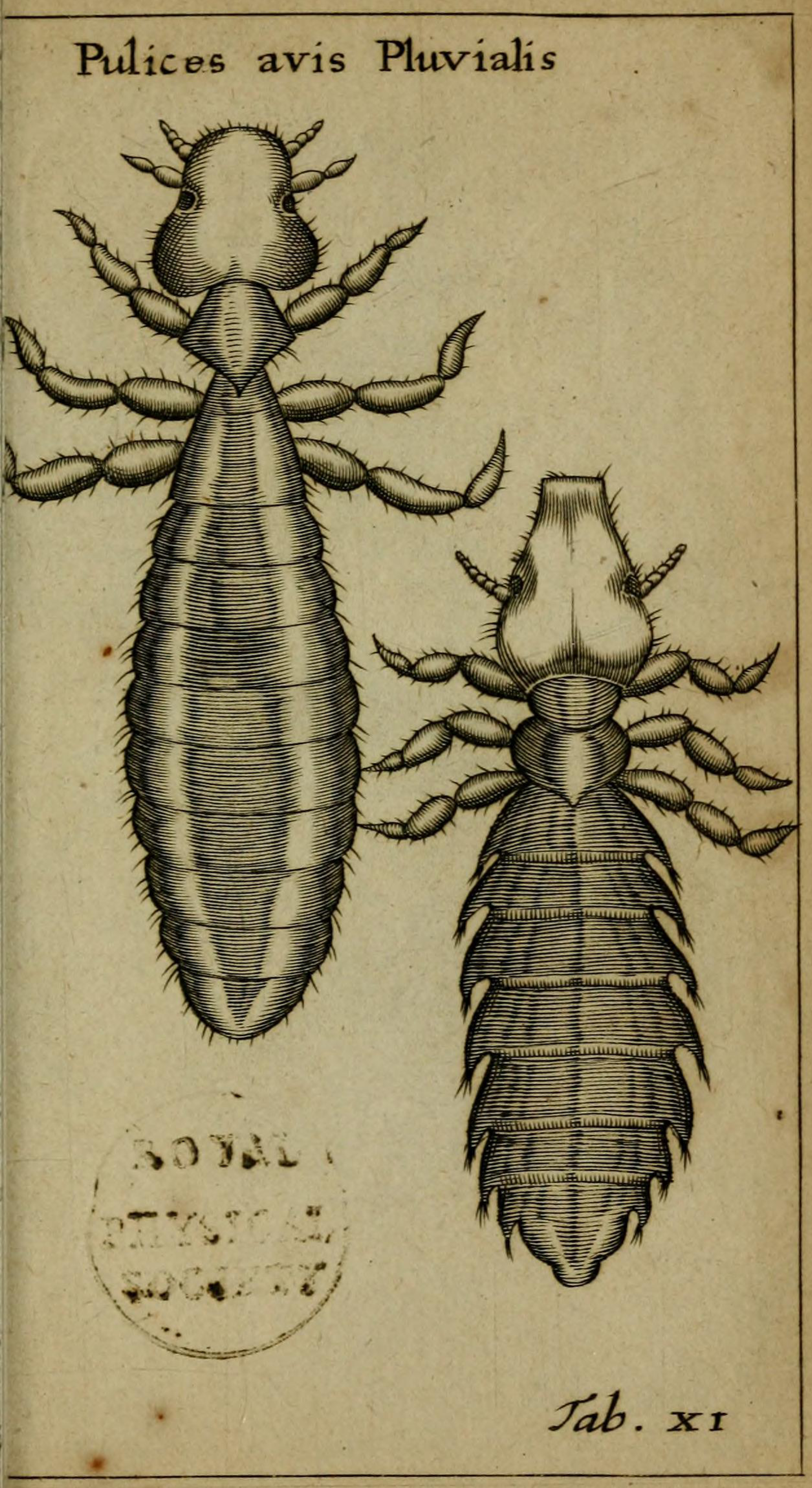
Redi's 1671 plate. Nitzsch gave the name L. (C.) ochraceum to the species illustrated on the top.

Colpocephalum was circumscribed by Christian Ludwig Nitzsch in 1818. Nitzsch classified this taxon as a subgenus of the genus Liotheum. He included four species, which in his taxonomy were called L. (C.) zebra, L. (C.) flavescens, L. (C.) subaequale, and L. (C.) ochraceum. The first three species were nomina nuda; only the last was accompanied with an indication to a previously published illustration, namely a 17th-century illustration by Francesco Redi. He wrote the indication as "Pulex avis pluvialis Redi exp. fig. sup." In order to keep this name valid, Theresa Clay and George Henry Evans Hopkins restricted Carl Linnaeus's 1758 name Pediculus charadrii to only the bottom figure of Redi's plate. Strictly applying the ICZN Code, the type species should have been Liotheum (Colpocephalum) ochraceum, as it was the only available name included in the original circumscription.

However, in 1906, Louis Georges Neumann designated "Liotheum (Colpocephalum) zebra Nitzsch" as the type species for this taxon instead. Other phthirapterists followed Neumann's designation. In 1948, Hopkins petitioned the International Commission on Zoological Nomenclature (ICZN) to officially allow this species to remain the genus's type species instead of "Liotheum (Colpocephalum) ochraceum; this was published in 1951. Hopkins also notes that L. (C.) ochraceum is congeneric with Colpocephalum uniseriatum Piaget, 1880, the type species of Actornithophilus, which would further complicate the situation. As the species C. zebra only became valid with Hermann Burmeister's species description of Colpocephalum zebra in 1838, he requested that the Plenary Powers of the ICZN designate Colpocephalum zebra Burmeister, 1838 as the type species of Colpocephalum in order to "avoid disastrous confusion."

Prior to petitioning the ICZN, Hopkins asked other experts in Mallophaga for their opinion on this matter. He received support from W. Büttiker, T. Clay, W. Eichler, K. C. Emerson, L. R. Guimarães, W. J. Jellison, S. v. Kéler, R. Meinertzhagen, E. O'Mahony, G. B. Thompson and F. L. Werneck; he received opposition from J. Bequaert and J. E. Webb, who both opposed the use of Plenary Powers in general. Later support came from Ernst Mayr. In 1952, the ICZN voted 17 to 0 in favor of Hopkins's proposal. The members of the commission who voted affirmatively were, in the order their ballots were received, N. D. Riley, E. M. Hering, W. T. Calman, J. R. Dymond, B. Hankó, P. B. Bonnet, H. E. Vokes, A. do Amaral, J. Pearson, J. C. Bradley, F. Hemming, T. Esaki, H. Lemche, R. Mertens, Á. Cabrera, N. R. Stoll, and H. Boschma. A ballot was not received from T. Jaczewski, the remaining member of the commission. The decision was published as part of Opinion 342 in 1955.

== Biology ==
Species in this genus parasitize birds of at least 13 orders, including:

- Accipitriformes
- Ciconiiformes (storks)
- Columbiformes (pigeons)
- Cuculiformes (cuckoos)
- Falconiformes (falcons)
- Galliformes (gamefowl)
- Gruiformes
- Passeriformes (passerines)
- Pelecaniformes (pelicans)
- Phoenicopteriformes (flamingos)
- Piciformes (woodpeckers)
- Psittaciformes (parrots)
- Strigiformes (owls)

External videos
- Video (.mov; 9.5 MB; 31 sec) of "highly mobile" C. turbinatum on a Galápagos hawk wing

Colpocephalum species are examples of "rapid running l[ice]". C. turbinatum, an ectoparasite of various birds including the Galápagos hawk, has been described as "highly mobile". Due to their speed, they can easily escape a bird trying to remove them through preening; this allows them to inhabit birds' breast, anal, and back regions, where slower lice would be readily removed.

Colpocephalum species eat feathers; pigeons with large infestations of C. turbinatum can have almost all of their vent region feathers' fluff eaten. High numbers of Colpocephalum can also damage a pigeon's flight feathers and decrease their flying power. Colpocephalum lice can live within flight feathers' quills. In addition to eating feathers, C. turbinatum consume their hosts' skin. Adults of this species have also been reported to engage in cannibalism in laboratory colonies, eating their own eggs and up to 80% of their nymphs.

== Species ==
The genus has approximately 135 species, including:

- Colpocephalum cooki Price & Beer, 1965
- Colpocephalum falconii Carriker, 1963
- Colpocephalum fregili Denny, 1842
- Colpocephalum pectinatum Osborn, 1902
- Colpocephalum scopinum Mjöberg, 1910
- Colpocephalum subzerafae Tendeiro, 1988
- Colpocephalum turbinatum Denny, 1842
- Colpocephalum zebra Burmeister, 1838
- Colpocephalum zerafae Ansari, 1955
- †Colpocephalum californici Price & Beer, 1963 - extinct
