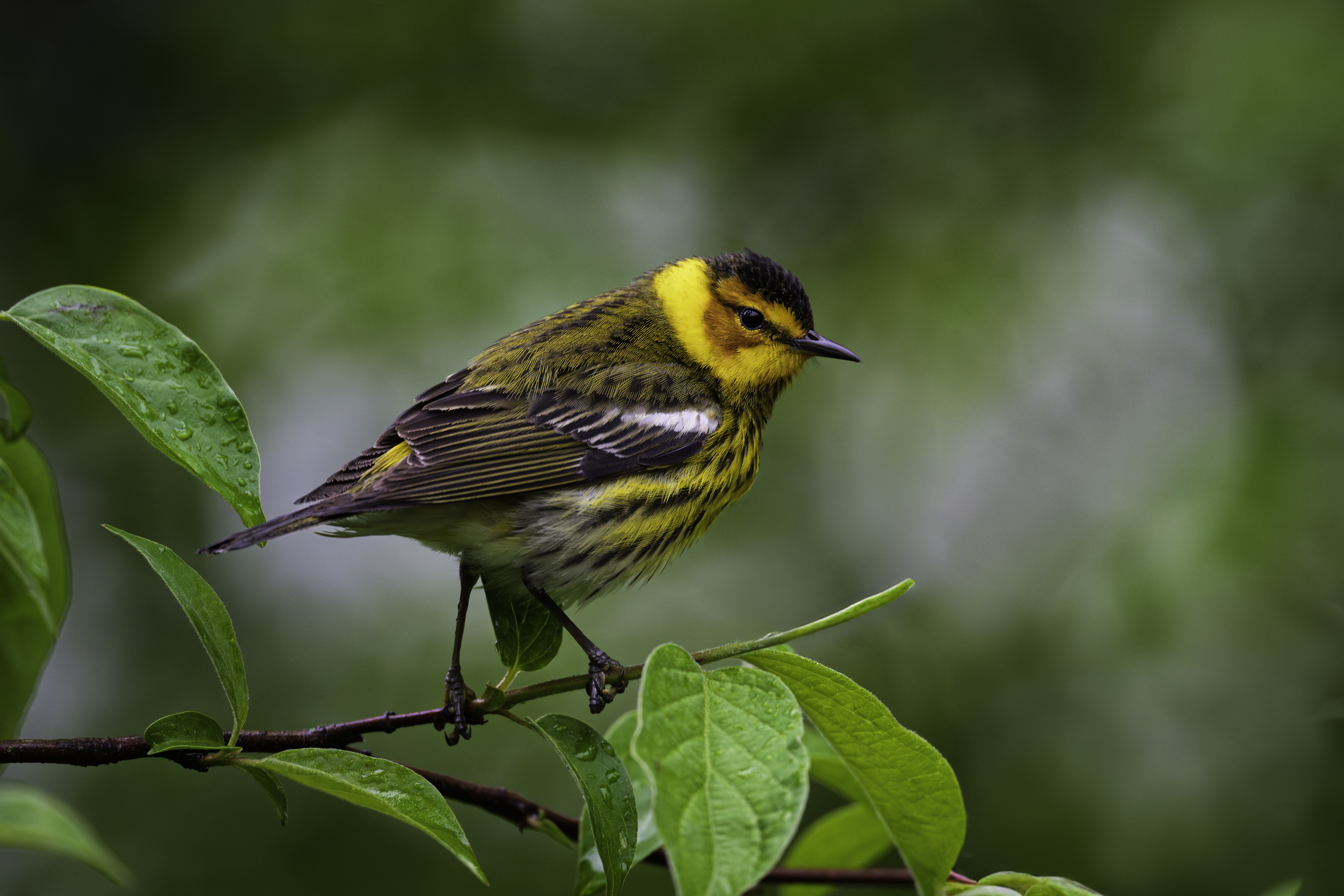
- Male
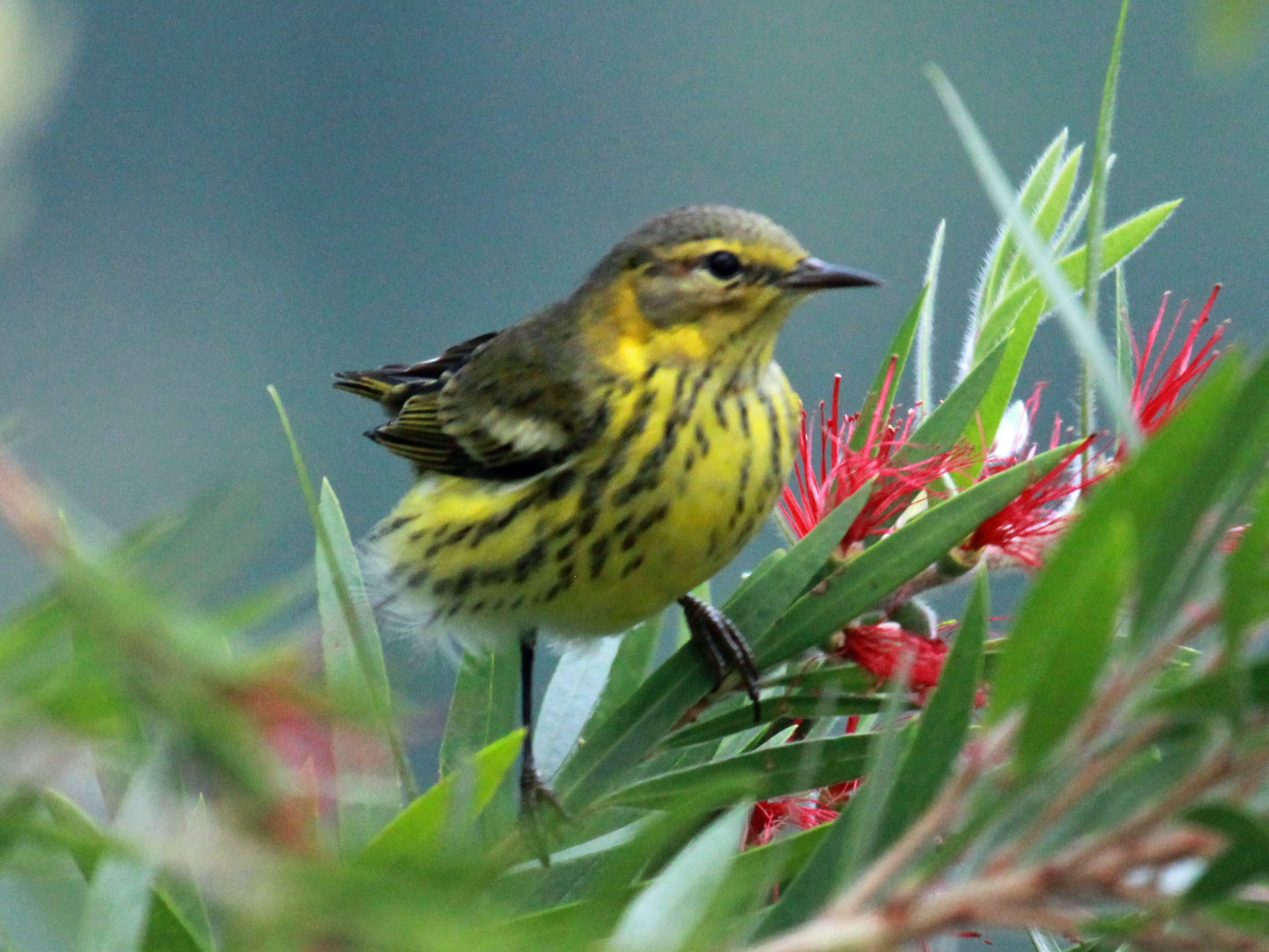
- Female

Conservation status
- Least Concern (IUCN 3.1)

Scientific classification
- Kingdom: Animalia
- Phylum: Chordata
- Class: Aves
- Order: Passeriformes
- Family: Parulidae
- Genus: Setophaga
- Species: S. tigrina

Binomial name
- Setophaga tigrina (Gmelin, JF, 1789)
- Range of S. tigrina Breeding range Wintering range

Synonyms
- Motacilla tigrina Gmelin, JF, 1789 (protonym); Dendroica tigrina; Sylvia maritima Wilson, 1812

= Cape May warbler =

Species of bird

The Cape May warbler (Setophaga tigrina) is a species of New World warbler. It breeds in northern North America. Its breeding range spans all but the westernmost parts of southern Canada, the Great Lakes region, and New England. It is migratory, wintering in the West Indies. This species is a very rare vagrant to western Europe, with two records in Britain as of October 2013. The English name refers to Cape May, New Jersey, where George Ord collected the specimen that was later described by Alexander Wilson.

== Taxonomy ==
The Cape May warbler was formally described in 1789 by the German naturalist Johann Friedrich Gmelin in his revised and expanded edition of Carl Linnaeus's Systema Naturae. He placed it in the genus Motacilla and coined the binomial name Motacilla tigrina. The specific epithet is from Latin tigrinus meaning "tigrine" or "barred or striped like a tiger". Gmelin based his account on "The yellow spotted fly-catcher" that had been described by the English naturalist George Edwards in 1758, and "Le figuier brun de Canada" that had been described by French zoologist Mathurin Jacques Brisson in 1760. The Cape May warbler is now one of more than 30 species placed in the genus Setophaga that was introduced in 1827 by the English naturalist William Swainson. The genus name Setophaga combines the Ancient Greek σης/sēs, σητος/sētos meaning "moth" with -φαγος/-phagos meaning "-eating". The species is monotypic: no subspecies are recognised.

The species was described in 1812 by the American ornithologist Alexander Wilson based on a single specimen that had been collected by George Ord at Cape May in New Jersey. Wilson introduced the English name "Cape May warbler". This species was not recorded again in Cape May for another 100 years, although it is now known as an uncommon migrant there.

== Description ==
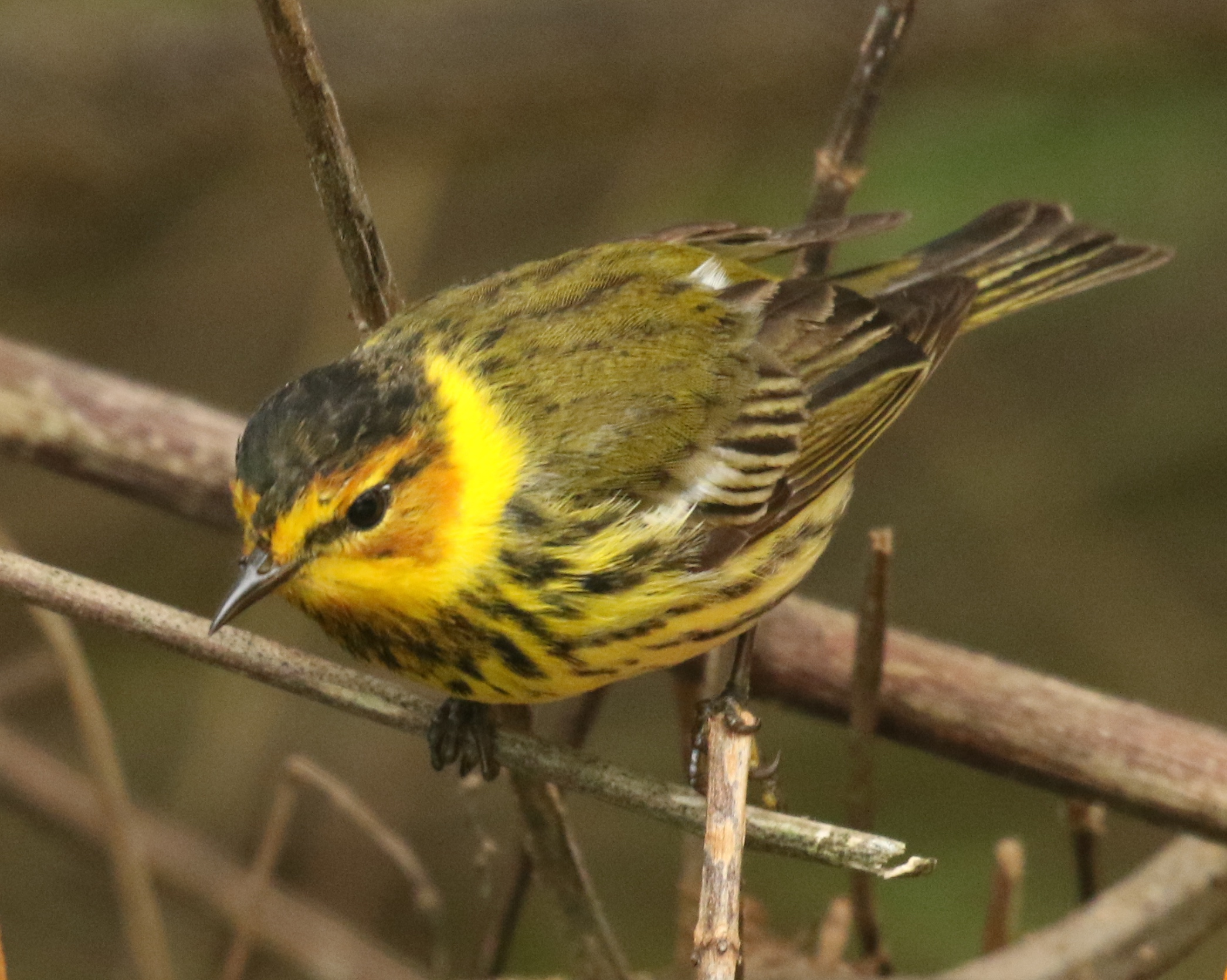
South Padre Island - Texas

This bird is a small passerine and is a mid-sized New World warbler. Length can vary from 12–14 cm (4.7–5.5 in), wingspan is 19–22 cm (7.5–8.7 in), and body mass can range from 9–17.3 g (0.32–0.61 oz). Among standard measurements, the wing chord is 6.1–7.3 cm (2.4–2.9 in), the tail is 4.3–5 cm (1.7–2.0 in), the bill is 0.9–1.2 cm (0.35–0.47 in) and the tarsus is 1.7–1.9 cm (0.67–0.75 in). The adult male Cape May warbler has a brown back, yellowish rump and dark brown crown. The underparts are yellow streaked with black, giving rise to the bird's scientific name. The throat and nape are bright yellow and the face has a striking chestnut patch framed in yellow with a black eyestripe. There is a narrow white wing bar.

Plumages of the female and immature male resemble washed-out versions of the adult male, lacking the strong head pattern. The yellowish rump, and at least indications of the white wing bar, are always present.

== Biology ==
This species is insectivorous and lays larger clutches in years when spruce budworm is abundant. It picks insects from the tips of conifer branches or flies out to catch insects. The Cape May warbler also feeds on berry juice and nectar in winter, and has, uniquely for a warbler, a tubular tongue to facilitate this behavior.

The breeding habitat of this bird is the edges of coniferous woodland. Cape May warblers nest in dense foliage near the trunk of the tree, commonly the black spruce, and lays a clutch of 4–9 eggs in a cup nest. This species can lay the largest clutch of any New World warbler, probably in response to increases in the numbers of spruce budworm during outbreaks.

The song of the Cape May warbler is a simple repetition of high tsi notes. The call is a thin sip. This bird usually sings from high perches.
