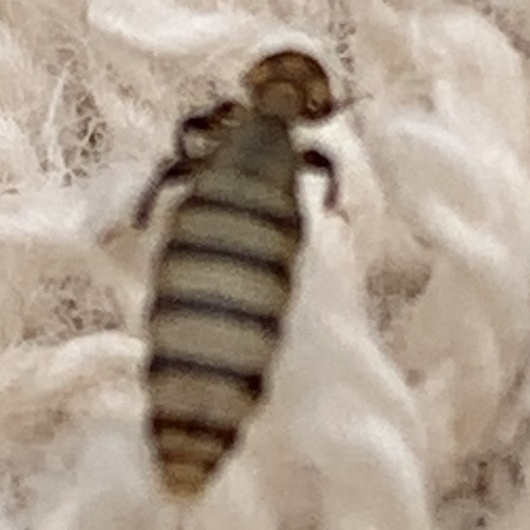

Scientific classification
- Kingdom: Animalia
- Phylum: Arthropoda
- Clade: Pancrustacea
- Class: Insecta
- Order: Psocodea
- Infraorder: Phthiraptera
- Family: Menoponidae
- Genus: Piagetiella; Neumann, 1906

= Piagetiella =

Insect genus

Piagetiella, also known as the pelican and cormorant throat pouch louse, is a genus of parasitic louse in the family Menoponidae.

== Description ==
Piagetiella are parasitic lice that live within the throat pouches of pelicans and cormorants. They feed on blood and skin cells, and often gather in rosette shapes with their heads facing inwards. They can cause hemorrhaging, ulcers, and tissue damage in the oral cavities and pouches of their hosts. Infestations may be transmitted from parent birds to their young when they feed them. Adult Piagetiella typically attach to an ulcer to feed, while secretions and excretions by larvae may cause necrosis and local inflammation. Because the lice occur within the pouch, hosts cannot remove them by preening.

== Species ==
Piagetiella contains the following species:

- Piagetiella titan
- Piagetiella caputincisum
- Piagetiella transitans
- Piagetiella africana
- Piagetiella incomposita
- Piagetiella bursaepelecani
- Piagetiella chilensis
- Piagetiella peralis
