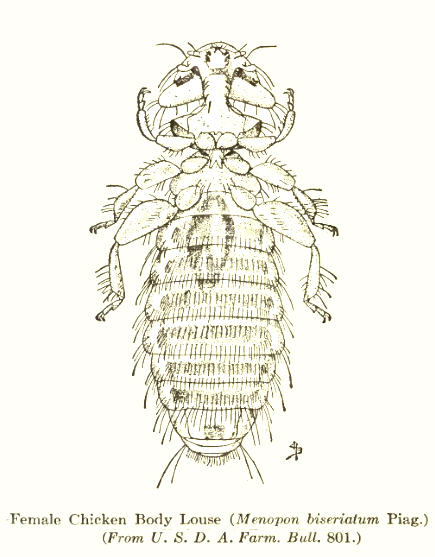
- Female Menopon biseriatum

Scientific classification
- Kingdom: Animalia
- Phylum: Arthropoda
- Clade: Pancrustacea
- Class: Insecta
- Order: Psocodea
- Suborder: Troctomorpha
- Infraorder: Phthiraptera
- Parvorder: Amblycera
- Family: Menoponidae

Genera
- Several, see text

= Menoponidae =

Family of lice

Menoponidae is a monophyletic family of lice in the superfamily of chewing lice, Amblycera, often referred to as the chicken body louse family. They are ectoparasites of a wide range of birds including chickens, which makes them important to understand for veterinary science and for human health. However, Menoponidae are not exclusive to poultry and are common parasites for migratory birds, with more and more species being discovered every year.

== Biology ==
Genera and species within the family Menoponidae are identified by their short antennae, concealed in grooves behind the eyes. To the untrained eye, it may appear as though they have no antennae. Most lice also further specialize to specific regions on their hosts such as the fluff at the base of the tail, the head, and the shaft. In fact, if a species that is better suited to tail feathers is presented with the opportunity to infest a different type of feather, they will make an attempt to eat those feathers but will fail to reproduce and soon die. As a group within the subfamily Amblycera, lice within the family Menoponidae are still partially dependent on blood as a source of food and are therefore better able to be generalists. The lice will scratch and nibble at the base of the feather in order to obtain this blood and modified mouth organs, such as the hypopharynx, is used to collect the blood. Due to their ability to utilize blood as a source of food, families in Amblycera, such as Menoponidae, often do not specialize to specific locations on the host and will lay their eggs most anywhere on the host. This lack of specialization often makes it more difficult to distinguish one species from another in Menoponidae, without the use of microscopic techniques. As with all lice, those in the family Menoponidae have the capability of reproducing quickly and causing large-scale outbreaks. Due to the close contact of poultry in large-scale productions, this capability is often acutely realized.

== Ecology ==
Lice in the family Menoponidae, due to their ability to feed on blood, are often the first parasites found on birds, especially birds with nidifugous young. Nidifugous young are born with feathers and therefore are particularly susceptible to lice in the family Menoponidae. Menoponidae lice frequently have a wider range of distribution among species. In a study of 25 heavily infested birds in India, lice in the family Menoponidae were the most-common parasites.

== Species of interest ==
Menacanthus stramineus – An ectoparasite of domesticated chickens and turkeys and the most common louse found on poultry worldwide. Eggs hatch in 4–5 days with a 14-day period required for maturatation from nymph to adult. Adult females can deposit approximately 1.5 eggs per day for 12.5 days.

Menopon gallinae – Louse commonly found on domesticated chickens and guinea fowl. Their common name, the shaft louse, is given due to their habit of resting on feather shafts when undisturbed. When disturbed, lice of these species will quickly run onto the body to avoid the threat. To study the transition of louse host-switching from birds to mammals, as the likeliest earliest diverging lineage of parasitic lice the 155MB genome of this species was sequenced for comparative genomics studies.

== Selected genera ==
- Actornithophilus
- Apterygon
- Austromenopon
- Colpocephalum
- Kurodaia
- Longimenopon
- Menacanthus
- Menopon
- Meromenopon
- Myrsidea
- Nosopon
- Piagetiella
- Psittacobrosus
