= George Ord Sr. =

English-American naval officer (1741–1806)

- Born: May 26, 1741; England, Great Britain
- Died: October 13, 1806 (aged 65); Philadelphia, Pennsylvania, United States
- Burial place: Gloria Dei Cemetery, Philadelphia
- Military career
- Branch: Continental Navy
- Rank: Captain
- Conflicts: American Revolutionary War

Captain George Ord Sr. (May 26, 1741 – October 13, 1806) was a sea captain during the American Revolution, and a privateer who worked on behalf of Philadelphia merchants, who later started a rope-making and ship-chandler business in Philadelphia. He was appointed Warden of the Port of Philadelphia in 1785.

== Early life ==
George Ord was born in England and immigrated to Southwark, Philadelphia County. On January 17, 1767, he married Rebecca Lindmeyer of Southwark, who was the sister-in-law of Reverend Eric Nordenlind, pastor of the Swedish Lutheran Church (commonly called Gloria Dei, or Old Swedes' Church) on the Delaware River. George and Rebecca resided at 784 Front St., in Philadelphia. They had four children including George Ord Jr., who was a famous naturalist, Ann (Ord) Pinkerton, Maria (Ord) McMullen, and Henrietta Ord. The family is buried at the Gloria Dei cemetery.

== Revolutionary Activity ==
As captain of the Lady Catherine, Ord led a successful gunpowder raid at Bermuda in August, 1775, and brought the munitions back to Philadelphia for use by the continental army.

== Death and Burial ==
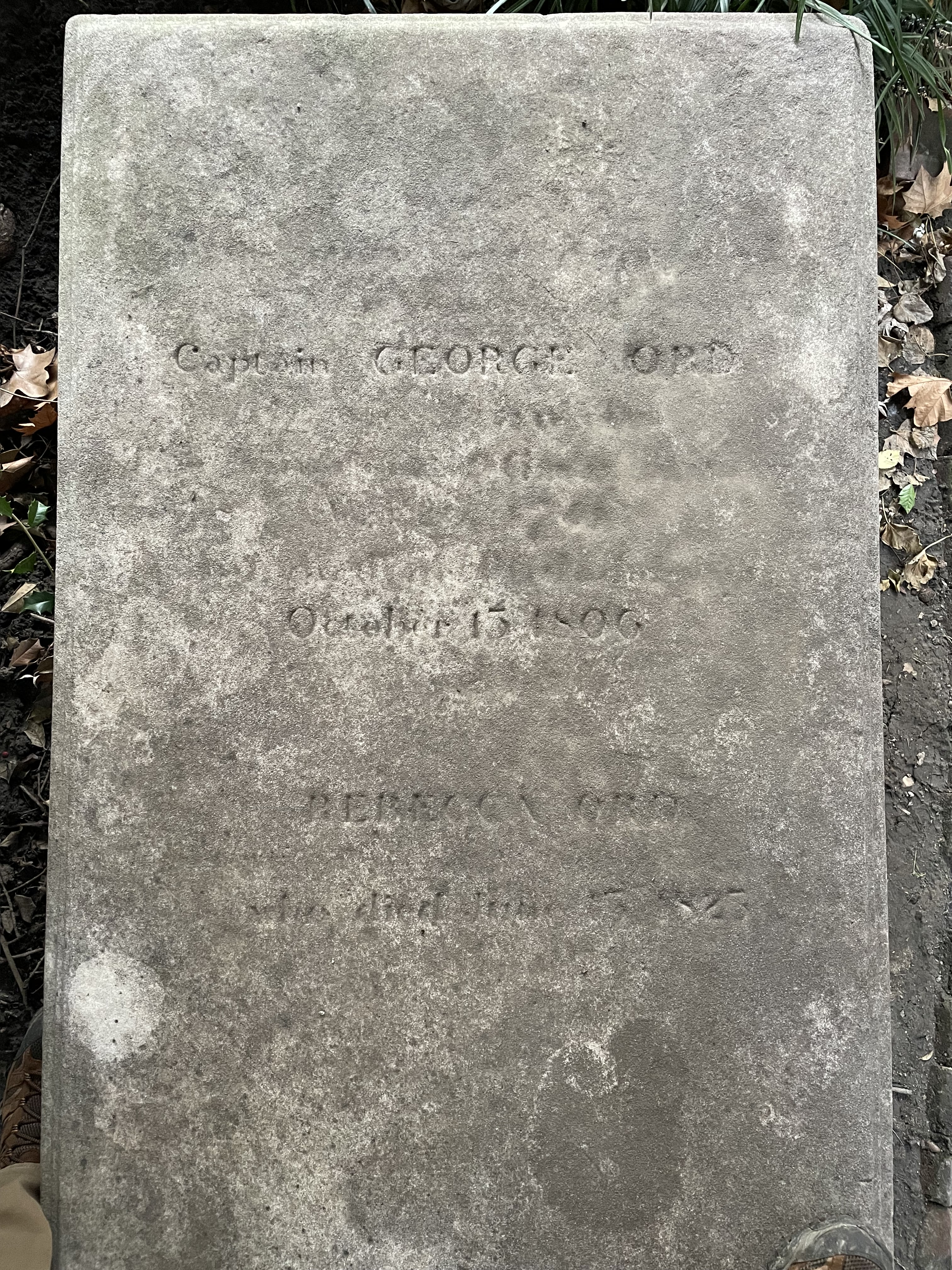
The gravestone of George Ord, Sr. at the Gloria Dei (Old Swedes) cemetery, Philadelphia, Pennsylvania, US (17 December 2022).

Ord died on October 13, 1806, and is buried in a family plot at Gloria Dei Church cemetery.
