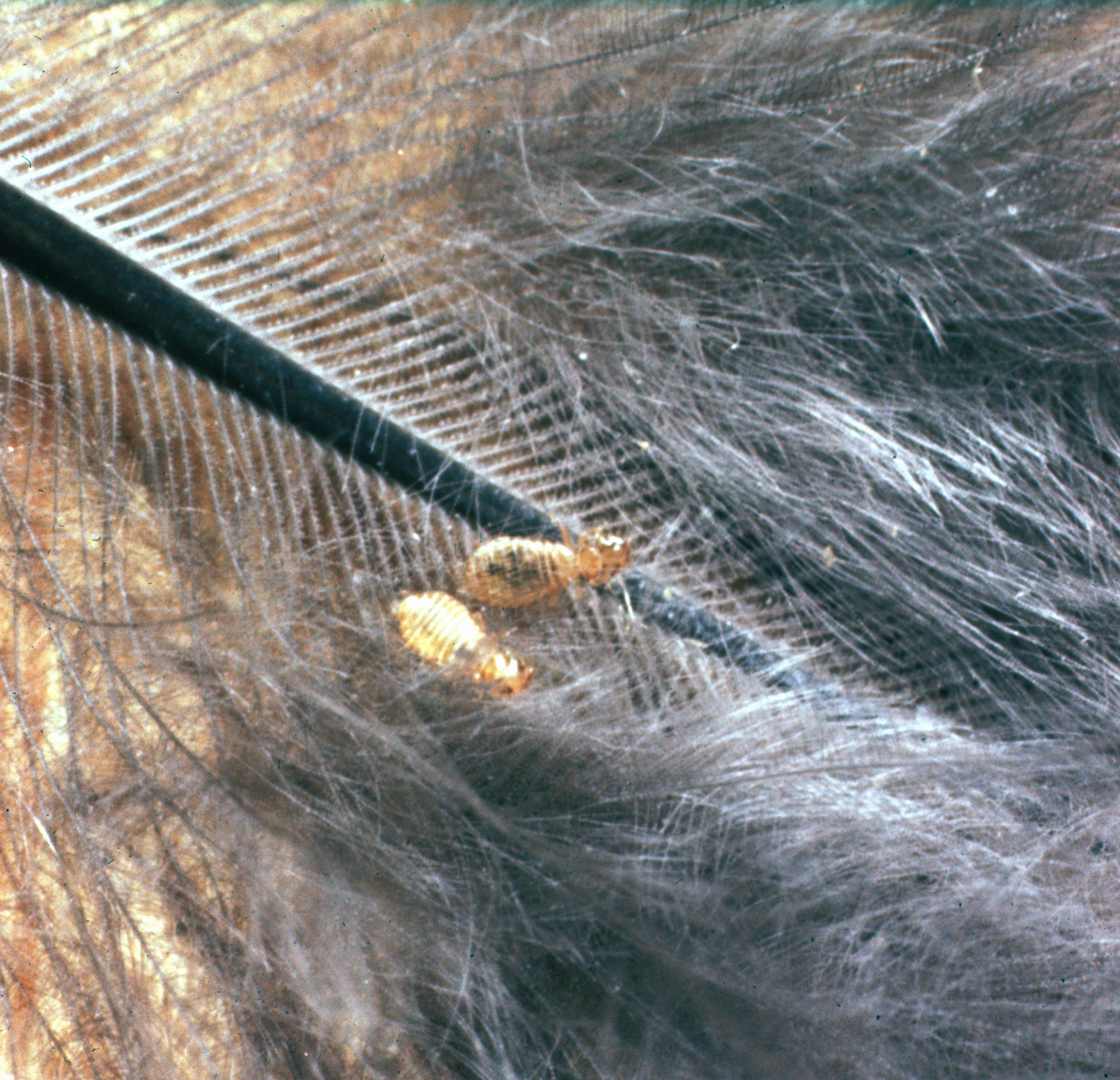
- Metomenopon

Scientific classification
- Domain: Eukaryota
- Kingdom: Animalia
- Phylum: Arthropoda
- Class: Insecta
- Order: Psocodea
- Family: Menoponidae
- Genus: Meromenopon; Clay & Meinertzhagen 1941

= Meromenopon =

Genus of lice

Meromenopon is a genus of chewing lice which parasitise birds. The species Meromenopon meropsis is a parasite of bee-eaters.
