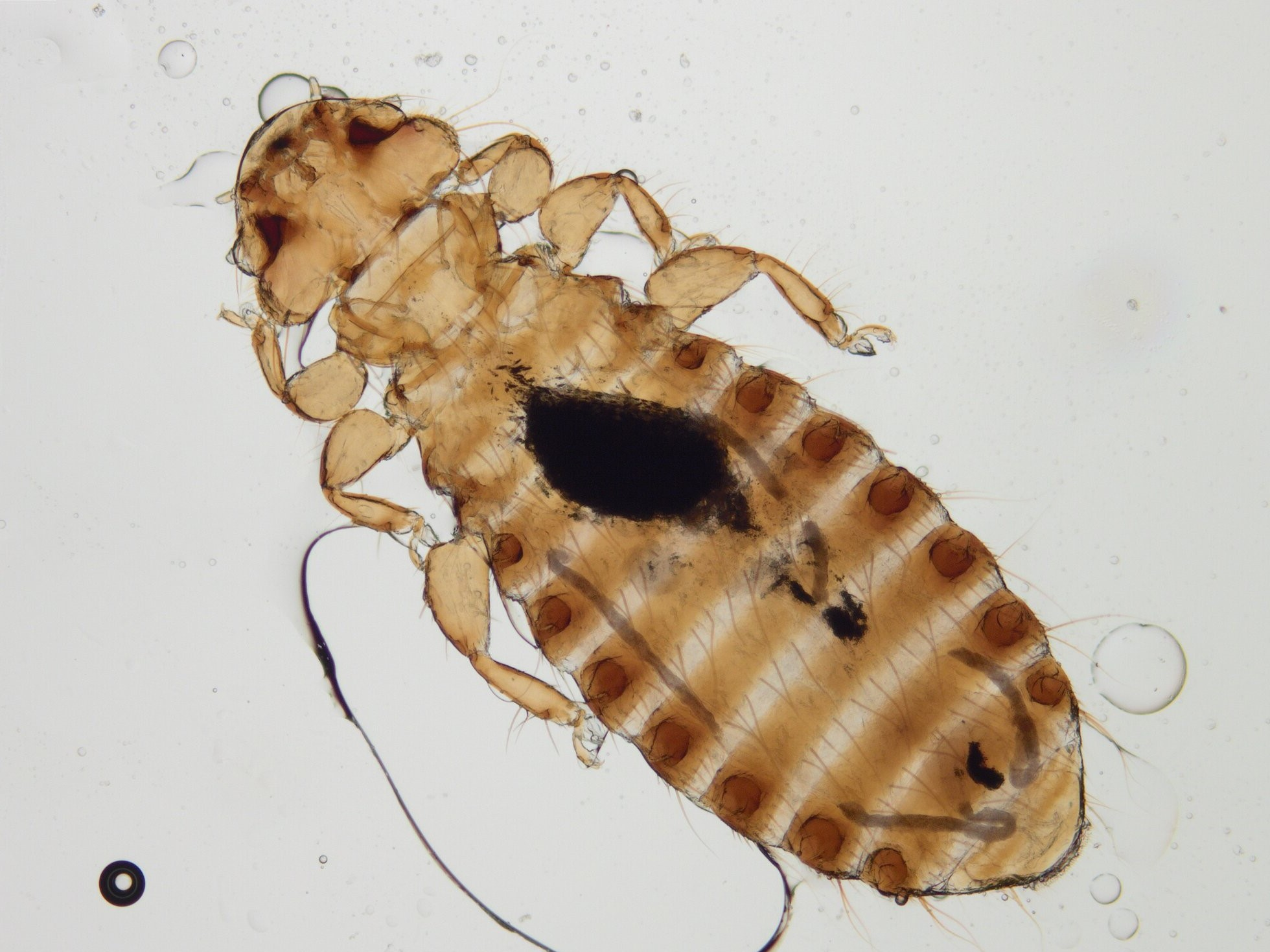
- Austromenopon stammeri

Scientific classification
- Domain: Eukaryota
- Kingdom: Animalia
- Phylum: Arthropoda
- Class: Insecta
- Order: Psocodea
- Family: Menoponidae
- Genus: Austromenopon; Bedford, 1939

Synonyms
- Procellariphaga Eichler, 1949

= Austromenopon =

Genus of lice

Austromenopon is a genus of lice belonging to the family Menoponidae. The genus has a cosmopolitan distribution. Species of the genus are known to use gulls as a host.

== Taxonomy ==
The following species are recognised in the genus Austromenopon:

- Austromenopon aegialitidis (Durrant, 1906)
- Austromenopon affine (Piaget, 1890)
- Austromenopon alpinum Timmermann, 1954
- Austromenopon atrofulvum (Piaget, 1880)
- Austromenopon beckii (Kellogg, 1906)
- Austromenopon brevifimbriatum (Piaget, 1880)
- Austromenopon bulweriae Timmermann, 1963
- Austromenopon confine (Blagoveshtchensky, 1948)
- Austromenopon corporosum (Kellogg & Kuwana, 1901)
- Austromenopon crocatum (Nitzsch, 1866)
- Austromenopon cursorium (Giebel, 1874)
- Austromenopon decorosum Zlotorzycka, 1968
- Austromenopon durisetosum (Blagoveshtchensky, 1948)
- Austromenopon echinatum Edwards, 1960
- Austromenopon edwardsi Price & Clay, 1972
- Austromenopon elliotti Timmermann, 1954
- Austromenopon enigki Timmermann, 1963
- Austromenopon erilis Zlotorzycka, 1968
- Austromenopon fuscofasciatum (Piaget, 1880)
- Austromenopon gregariae Timmermann, 1954
- Austromenopon haematopi Timmermann, 1954
- Austromenopon hatutuense Timmermann, 1963
- Austromenopon hatutuensis Timmermann, 1963
- Austromenopon himantopi Timmermann, 1954
- Austromenopon hystriculum Zlotorzycka, 1968
- Austromenopon icterum (Burmeister, 1838)
- Austromenopon leucurae Timmermann, 1954
- Austromenopon limosae Timmermann, 1954
- Austromenopon longithoracicum (Piaget, 1880)
- Austromenopon lutescens (Burmeister, 1838)
- Austromenopon madagascariensis (Mjoberg, 1910)
- Austromenopon meyeri (Giebel, 1874)
- Austromenopon micrandrum (Nitzsch, 1866)
- Austromenopon micrandum (Nitzsch, 1866)
- Austromenopon narboroughi (Kellogg & Kuwana, 1902)
- Austromenopon navigans (Kellogg, 1896)
- Austromenopon nigropleurum (Denny, 1842)
- Austromenopon oceanodromae Price & Clay, 1972
- Austromenopon ossifragae (Eichler, 1949)
- Austromenopon paululum (Kellogg & Chapman, 1899)
- Austromenopon pelagicum Timmermann, 1963
- Austromenopon phaeopodis (Schrank, 1802)
- Austromenopon pinguis (Kellogg, 1896)
- Austromenopon popellus (Piaget, 1890)
- Austromenopon sachtlebeni Timmermann, 1954
- Austromenopon sohni Ansari, 1955
- Austromenopon spenceri Timmermann, 1956
- Austromenopon squatarolae Timmermann, 1954
- Austromenopon stammeri Timmermann, 1963
- Austromenopon transversum (Denny, 1842)
