= Menopon =

Scientific classification
- Domain: Eukaryota
- Kingdom: Animalia
- Phylum: Arthropoda
- Class: Insecta
- Order: Psocodea
- Family: Menoponidae
- Genus: Menopon; Nitzsch, 1818

Genus of lice

Menopon is a genus of lice belonging to the family Menoponidae.

The species of this genus are found in Europe, Northern America, Southwestern Asia.

Species:

- Menopon carrikeri Emerson, 1954
- Menopon clayae Emerson, 1954
- Menopon deryloi Zlotorzycka, 1972
- Menopon ferrisi Emerson, 1954
- Menopon gallinae (Linnaeus, 1758)
- Menopon hamatum L.G.Neumann, 1912
- Menopon hopkinsi Emerson, 1954
- Menopon interpositum Ansari, 1951
- Menopon jellisoni Emerson, 1954
- Menopon kuntzi Emerson & Stojanovich, 1963
- Menopon pallens T.Clay, 1949
- Menopon sigialitidis D.Lamina I
- Menopon spinulosum Giebel, 1874
- Menopon subgallinae Emerson, 1954
- Menopon truncatum Giebel, 1874
