= Jadwiga Złotorzycka =

Polish entomologist

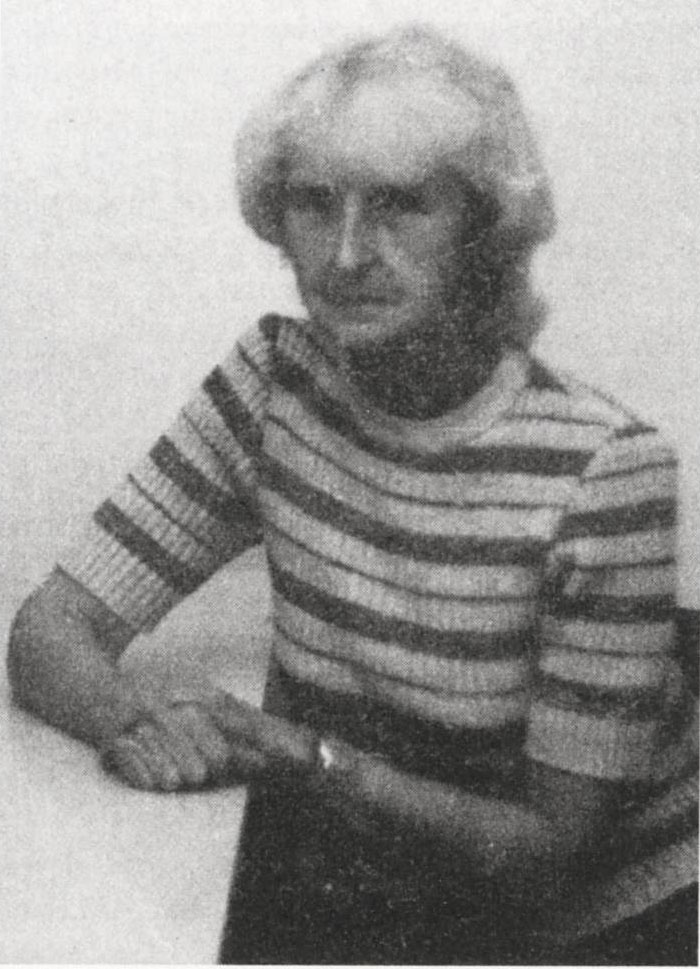
Jadwiga Złotorzycka (1926-2002)

Jadwiga Zlotorzycka (1926–2002) was a Polish entomologist specialising in Mallophaga. She worked in the Parasitology Department of the University of Wroclaw.

== Life and career ==
Zlotorzycka was born in Warsaw, Poland in 1926 and grew up in Lviv, Ukraine. She began studying at the University of Wroclaw in 1945, and worked at the Museum of Natural History there while a student. She later pursued doctoral studies there. Zlotorzycka became head of the University's Department of General Parasitology in 1972.

== Works ==
Partial list

- With M. Modrzejewska, 1988. Katalog Fauny Polski. Mallophaga. In Polish.
- Catalogue of the Polish parasitic fauna. Part IV. Bird Parasites. Fascicle 3. Parasitic Arthropods. (PNW) Polish Scientific Publishers (1990)
