= George Ord =

American zoologist

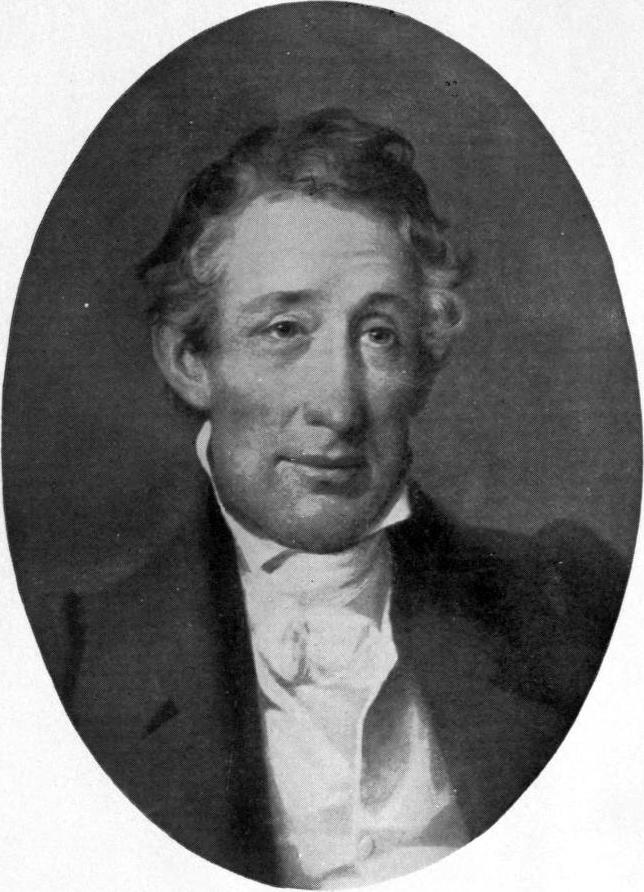
- George Ord, in Rhoads
- Born: March 4, 1781; Philadelphia, Pennsylvania, US
- Died: January 24, 1866 (aged 84); Philadelphia, Pennsylvania, US
- Resting place: Gloria Dei Church cemetery
- Scientific career
- Fields: naturalist, ornithologist
- Author abbrev. (zoology): Ord

George Ord, Jr. (March 4, 1781 – January 24, 1866) was an American zoologist who specialized in North American ornithology and mammalogy. Based in part on specimens collected by Lewis and Clark in the North American interior, Ord's article "Zoology of North America" (1815), which was published in the second American edition of William Guthrie's Geographical, Historical, and Commercial Grammar (Johnson and Warner), has been recognized as the "first systematic zoology of America by an American".

Ord (1815) published the first scientific descriptions of Pronghorn antelope (Antilocapra americana), Grizzly bear (Ursus arctos horribilis), Meadow vole (Microtus pennsylvanicus), Bushy-tailed woodrat (Neotoma cinerea), Eastern gray squirrel (Sciurus carolinensis pennsylvanicus), Columbian ground squirrel (Urocitellus columbianus), black-tailed prairie dog (Cynomys ludovicianus), Bonaparte's gull (Chroicocephalus philadelphia), ring-billed gull (Larus delawarensis), Tundra swan (Cygnus columbianus), and Columbian sharp-tailed grouse (Tympanuchus phasianellus columbianus).

Ord is widely known for challenging the works of John James Audubon.

== Early life ==
Ord was born and died at the same residence, 784 Front St., in Philadelphia. His mother was Swedish, and his father, Captain George Ord, Sr. (1741–1806), a celebrated naval captain during the American Revolution, was the proprietor of a rope-making business and served as Warden of the Port of Philadelphia. Ord joined the family business and continued it after his father's death.

== American Ornithology ==
Ord met Alexander Wilson in the summer of 1811, and accompanied him on two collecting expeditions (each four weeks duration) to Cape May, New Jersey, during the spring migration seasons of May 1812 and May 1813. During the 1812 trip, Ord collected a bird that neither he nor Wilson could identify. Wilson illustrated Ord's specimen and named it "Cape May Warbler / Sylvia maritima" in volume 6 of American Ornithology (1812), writing:

"This new and beautiful little species was discovered in a maple swamp, in Cape May county, not far from the coast, by Mr. George Ord of this city, who accompanied me on a shooting excursion to that quarter in the month of May last. Through the zeal and activity of this gentleman I succeeded in procuring many rare and elegant birds among the sea islands and extensive salt marshes that border that part of the Atlantic; and much interesting information relative to their nests, eggs, and particular habits. I have also at various times been favored with specimens of other birds from the same friend, for all which I return my grateful acknowledgments."

The letter-press for volume 8 of American Ornithology (1814) was complete by August 1813, but Wilson's "great anxiety to conclude the work, condemned him to an excess of toil, which, inflexible as was his mind, his bodily frame was unable to bear." Wilson died of complications from dysentery on August 23, 1813; one week earlier, he named Ord an executor of his "last Will and testament". After Wilson's death, Ord completed the publishing and distribution, and compiled Wilson's unpublished writings for a final (9th) volume which contained an extended "Biographical sketch of Alexander Wilson".

Ord published a second edition of American Ornithology in 1824–25. The first 6 volumes were faithful reprints of the originals, confusingly so because they bear the dates of the first editions on their title pages (1808–12). In contrast, volumes 7–9 were revised and expanded by Ord and included a much larger version of his "Life of Wilson" (198 pp., versus 36 pages in the original 1814 version).

== Academic life ==
In 1815, Ord was elected to the Academy of Natural Sciences of Philadelphia (ANSP), where he would later serve as vice president from (1816–34) and president (1851–58). He became a member of the American Philosophical Society in 1817, and later served as secretary (1820–27), vice president (1832–35), councilor (1839), treasurer (1842–47), and librarian (1842–48).

In 1817, he joined the "first private, museum sponsored exploration in the United States", when he, Thomas Say, Titian Ramsay Peale and William Maclure went on a collecting expedition to Georgia and Florida, sponsored by the ANSP.

Ord, a supporter of scientific peer review, frequently served on ANSP publications committees, reviewing the work of his peers. He was a reviewer of three influential papers authored by Charles Lucien Bonaparte in 1824 and 1825, which included the original taxonomic descriptions of Wilson's Storm Petrel (Procellaria Wilsonii) in 1824, and Transvolcanic Jay (Aphelocoma ultramarina), and Yellow-winged Cacique (Cassiculus melanicterus) in 1825. In 1829 he retired from the rope-making business to devote more time to science.

Ord authored peer-reviewed articles on a wide variety of topics including feather molt, the mating behavior of the Eastern Box Turtle (Terrapene carolina carolina), and the taxonomy of the Florida Scrub Jay (Aphelocoma coerulescens). His publication about "An account of an American species of the genus Tantalus or Ibis" (1817) was the first account of the Glossy Ibis (Plegadis falcinellus) in the United States, as noted by Bonaparte in his quasi-continuation of Wilson's American Ornithology (1833):

"The credit of having added this beautiful species [Plegadis falcinellus] to the fauna of the United States is due to Mr. Ord, the well known friend and biographer of Wilson, who several years ago gave a good history and minute description of it in the Journal of the Academy of Philadelphia, under the name Tantalus mexicanus? His excellent memoir would have been sufficient to establish its identity with the species found so extensively in the old world, even if the specimen itself, carefully preserved in the Philadelphia Museum, did not place this beyond the possibility of doubt."

Ord was a vocal opponent of John James Audubon.

He also wrote biographical memoirs of Charles Alexandre Lesueur, published in 1849, and Thomas Say, published in 1859, that have been valuable sources of information for modern scholars.

== Death and Burial ==
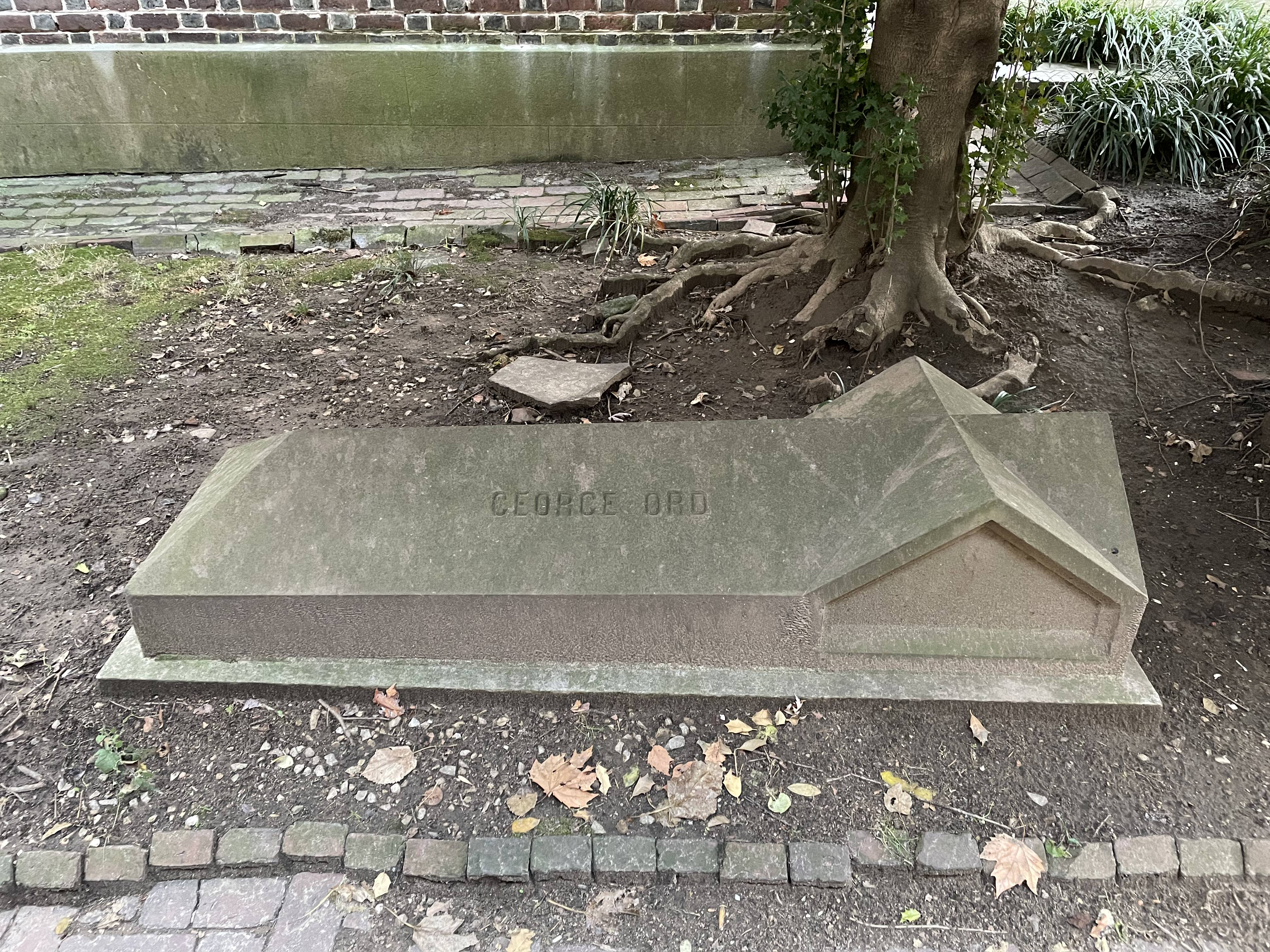
The gravesite of George Ord, Jr. at the Gloria Dei (Old Swedes) cemetery, Philadelphia, Pennsylvania, US (17 December 2022).

Ord died on January 23, 1866, and is buried in a family plot at Gloria Dei Church cemetery.

== Published works ==
- Ord, G. 1817. Account of a North American quadruped, supposed to belong to the genus Ovis. Journal of the Academy of Natural Sciences of Philadelphia 1(1), 8–12.
- Ord, G. 1817. An account of an American species of the genus Tantalus or Ibis. Journal of the Academy of Natural Sciences of Philadelphia 1(4), 53–57. (BHL link)
- Ord, G. 1818. Observations on two species of the genus Gracula of Latham. Journal of the Academy of Natural Sciences of Philadelphia 1(7), 253–260. (Read May 19, 1818) (BHL link)
- Ord, G. 1818. An account of the Florida Jay of Bartram. Journal of the Academy of Natural Sciences of Philadelphia 1(7), 345–347. (Read May 26, 1818) (BHL link)
- Ord, G. 1828. Sketch of the life of Alexander Wilson, author of the American Ornithology. Harrison Hall, Philadelphia. (Google Books link)
- Ord, G. 1830. Some observations on the moulting of birds. Transactions of the American Philosophical Society new series 3, 292–299. (Read March 7, 1828) (BHL link)
