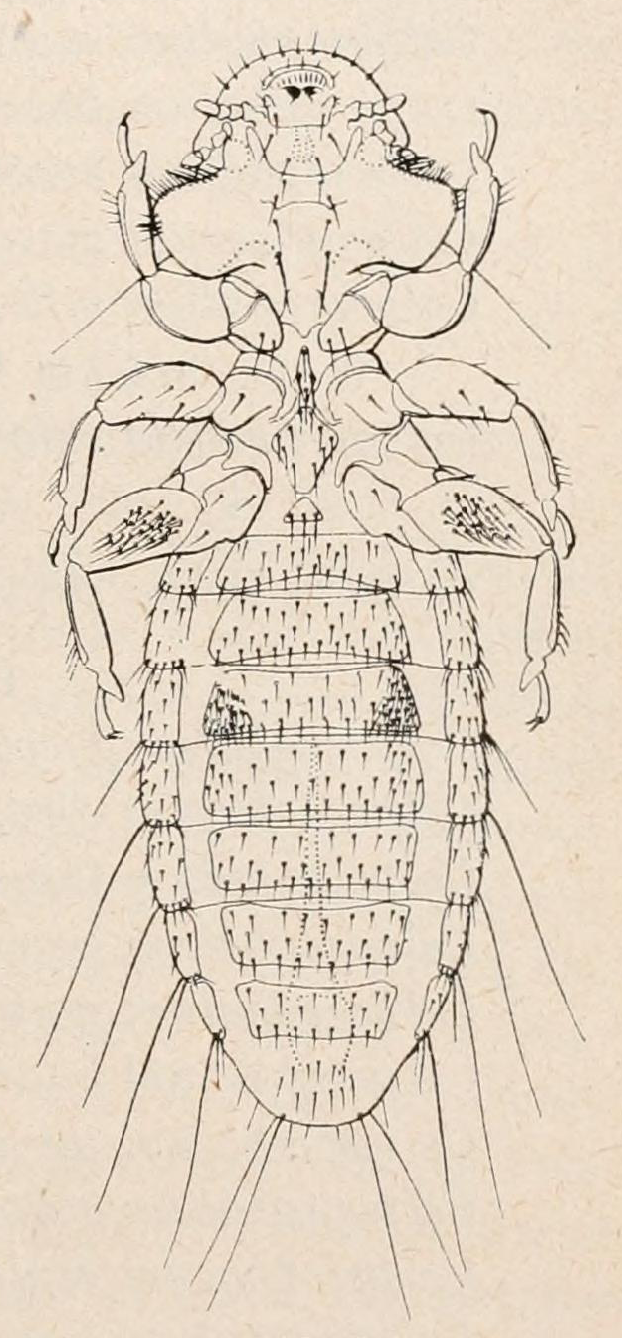
- Dorsal view of male A. uniseriatus

Scientific classification
- Kingdom: Animalia
- Phylum: Arthropoda
- Class: Insecta
- Order: Psocodea
- Infraorder: Phthiraptera
- Family: Menoponidae
- Genus: Actornithophilus; Ferris, 1916

Type species
- Colpocephalum uniseriatum Piaget, 1880

Synonyms
- Clypeodon Timmermann, 1954; Diactornithophilus Balát, 1953; Larithophilus Złotorzycka, 1963

= Actornithophilus =

Genus of lice

Actornithophilus is a genus of louse in the family Amblycera. It was circumscribed by Gordon Floyd Ferris in 1916. Its species are ectoparasites of birds in the order Charadriiformes.

== Species ==
As of 2017, the following species are recognized:

- A. ardeolae Timmermann, 1954
- A. bicolor (Piaget, 1880)
- A. canuti Price & Leibovitz, 1969
- A. ceruleus (Timmermann, 1954)
- A. crinitus Clay, 1962
- A. erinaceus Timmermann, 1954
- A. flumineus Clay, 1962
- A. gracilis (Piaget, 1880)
- A. grandiceps (Piaget, 1880)
- A. himantopi Blagoveshtchensky, 1951
- A. hoplopteri (Mjöberg, 1910)
- A. incisus (Piaget, 1880)
- A. kilauensis (Kellogg & Chapman, 1902)
- A. lacustris Clay, 1962
- A. limarius Clay, 1962
- A. limosae (Kellogg, 1908)
- A. lyallpurensis Ansari, 1955
- A. mexicanus Emerson, 1953
- A. multisetosus Blagoveshtchensky, 1940
- A. nodularis Martinho Guimarães, 1988
- A. ocellatus (Rudow, 1869)
- A. ochraceus (Nitzsch, 1818)
- A. paludosus Clay, 1962
- A. patellatus (Piaget, 1890)
- A. pauliani Séguy, 1953
- A. pediculoides (Mjöberg, 1910
- A. piceus (Denny, 1842)
- A. pustulosus (Piaget, 1880)
- A. sabulosus Clay, 1962
- A. sedes Eichler, 1944
- A. spinulosus (Piaget, 1880)
- A. stictus (Kellogg & Paine, 1911)
- A. tetralicis Clay, 1962
- A. totani (Schrank, 1803)
- A. umbrinus (Burmeister, 1838)
- A. uniseriatus (Piaget, 1880)
