= List of birds of Delhi =

The union territory of Delhi, India, has 472 bird species within its boundaries.

The official state bird of Delhi is the house sparrow, Passer domesticus.

This list's taxonomic treatment (designation and sequence of orders, families and species) and nomenclature (common and scientific names) follow the conventions of the IOC World Bird List, version 11.2. This list also uses British English throughout. Any bird names or other wording follows that convention.

The following tag has been used to highlight accidental species:

- (V) Vagrant - Also known as a rarity, it refers to a species that rarely or accidentally occurs in Delhi: typically less than ten confirmed records.

== Ducks, geese, and swans ==
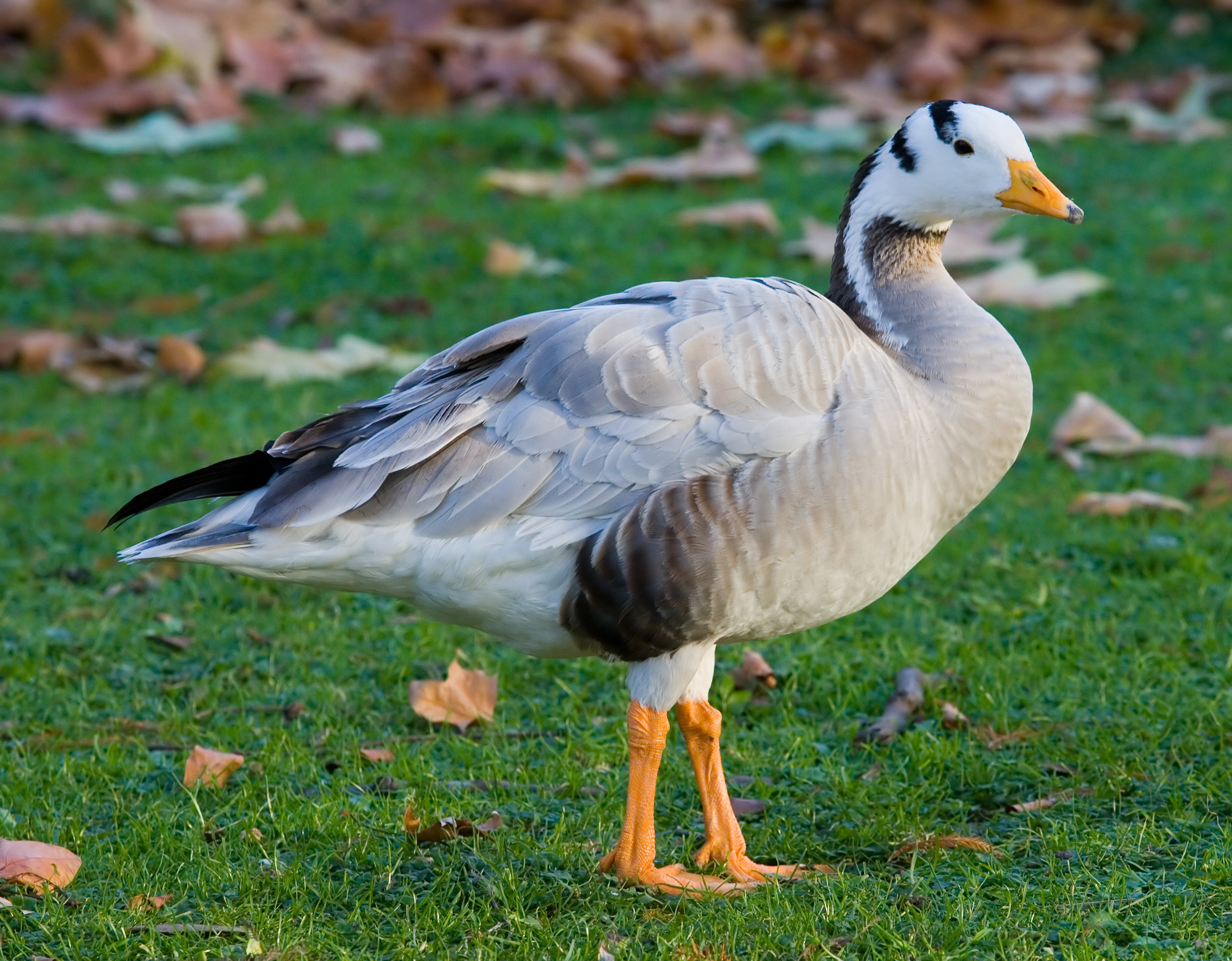
Bar-headed goose

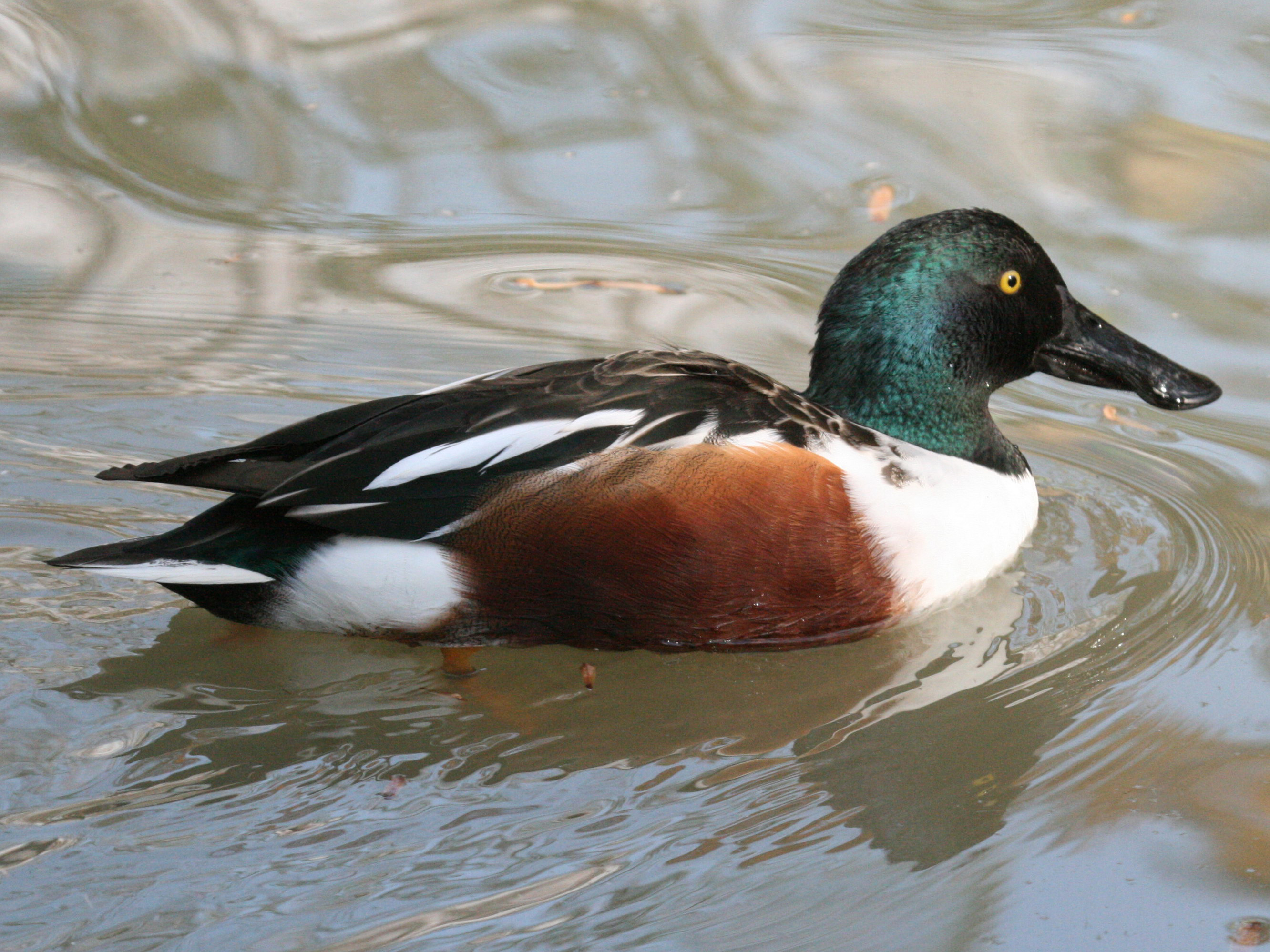
Northern shoveller

Order: Anseriformes Family: Anatidae

Anatidae includes the ducks and most duck-like waterfowl, such as geese and swans. These birds are adapted to an aquatic existence with webbed feet, flattened bills, and feathers that are excellent at shedding water due to an oily coating.

- Lesser whistling duck, Dendrocygna javanica
- Bar-headed goose, Anser indicus
- Greylag goose, Anser anser
- Greater white-fronted goose, Anser albifrons
- Lesser white-fronted goose, Anser erythropus (V)
- Knob-billed duck, Sarkidiornis melanotos
- Ruddy shelduck, Tadorna ferruginea
- Common shelduck,Tadorna tadorna
- Cotton pygmy goose, Nettapus coromandelianus
- Baikal teal, Sibirionetta formosa (V)
- Garganey, Spatula querquedula
- Northern shoveler, Spatula clypeata
- Gadwall, Mareca strepera
- Falcated duck, Mareca falcata
- Eurasian wigeon, Mareca penelope
- Indian spot-billed duck, Anas poecilorhyncha
- Mallard, Anas platyrhynchos
- Northern pintail, Anas acuta
- Eurasian teal, Anas crecca
- Marbled duck, Marmaronetta angustirostris
- Red-crested pochard, Netta rufina
- Common pochard, Aythya ferina
- Ferruginous duck, Aythya nyroca
- Baer's pochard, Aythya baeri (V)
- Tufted duck, Aythya fuligula
- Greater scaup, Aythya marila
- Smew, Mergellus albellus (V)
- Red-breasted merganser, Mergus serrator (V)

== Pheasants and allies ==
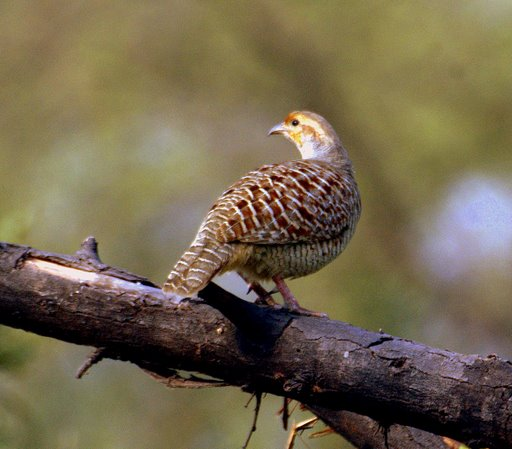
Grey francolin

Order: Galliformes Family: Phasianidae

The Phasianidae are a family of terrestrial birds which consists of quails, partridges, snowcocks, francolins, spurfowls, tragopans, monals, pheasants, peafowls and jungle fowls. In general, they are plump (although they vary in size) and have broad, relatively short wings.

- Black francolin, Francolinus francolinus
- Grey francolin, Francolinus pondicerianus
- Common quail, Coturnix coturnix
- Rain quail, Coturnix coromandelica
- Jungle bush quail, Perdicula asiatica
- Rock bush quail, Perdicula argoondah
- Indian peafowl, Pavo cristatus

== Nightjars ==
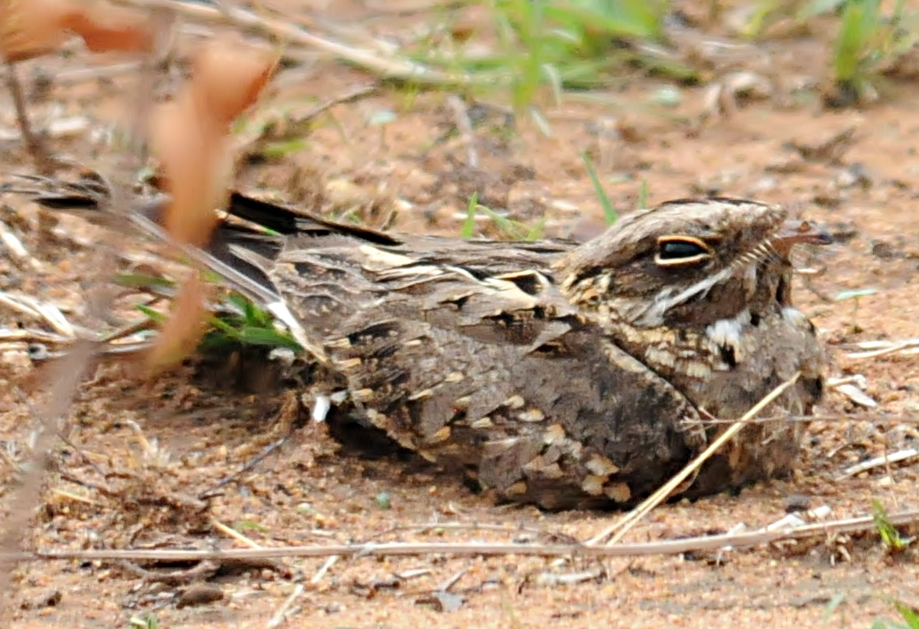
Indian nightjar

Order: Caprimulgiformes Family: Caprimulgidae

Nightjars are medium-sized nocturnal birds that usually nest on the ground. They have long wings, short legs and very short bills. Most have small feet, of little use for walking, and long pointed wings. Their soft plumage is camouflaged to resemble bark or leaves.

- Jungle nightjar, Caprimulgus indicus
- Sykes's nightjar, Caprimulgus mahrattensis
- Large-tailed nightjar, Caprimulgus macrurus
- Indian nightjar, Caprimulgus asiaticus
- Savanna nightjar, Caprimulgus affinis

== Treeswifts ==
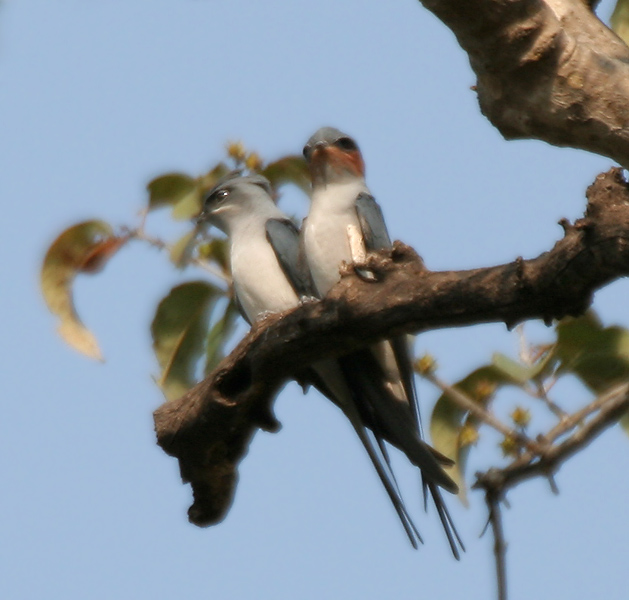
Crested treeswift

Order: Apodiformes Family: Hemiprocnidae

The treeswifts, also called crested swifts, are closely related to the true swifts. They differ from the other swifts in that they have crests, long forked tails and softer plumage.

- Crested treeswift, Hemiprocne coronata

== Swifts ==
Order: Apodiformes Family: Apodidae

Swifts are small birds which spend the majority of their lives flying. These birds have very short legs and never settle voluntarily on the ground, perching instead only on vertical surfaces. Many swifts have long swept-back wings which resemble a crescent or boomerang.

- Asian palm swift, Cypsiurus balasiensis
- Alpine swift, Tachymarptis melba
- Blyth's swift, Apus leuconyx
- Little swift, Apus affinis

== Bustards ==
Order: Otidiformes Family: Otididae

Bustards are large terrestrial birds mainly associated with dry open country and steppes in the Old World. They are omnivorous and nest on the ground. They walk steadily on strong legs and big toes, pecking for food as they go. They have long broad wings with "fingered" wingtips and striking patterns in flight. Many have interesting mating displays.

- Lesser florican, Sypheotides indicus

== Cuckoos ==
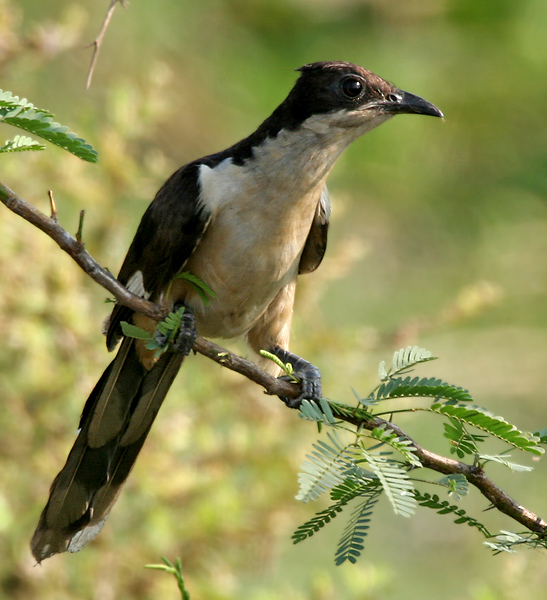
Jacobin cuckoo

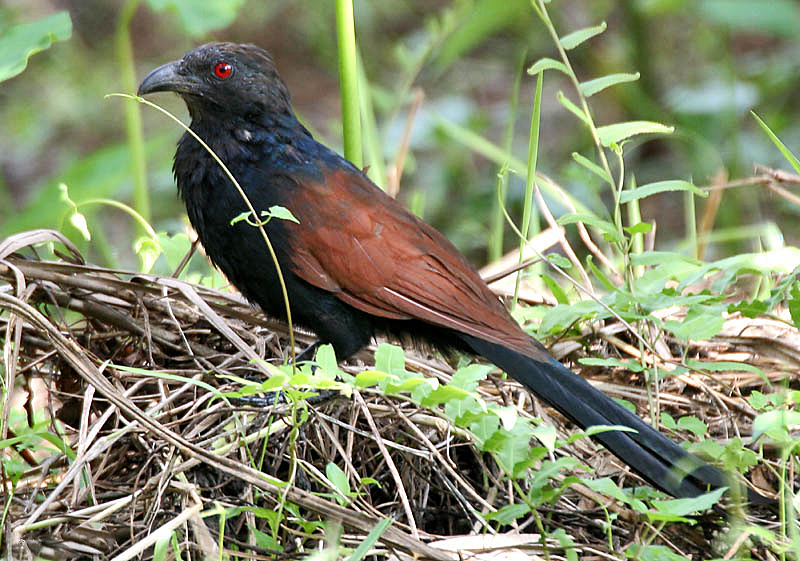
Greater coucal

Order: Cuculiformes Family: Cuculidae

The family Cuculidae includes cuckoos, roadrunners and anis. These birds are of variable size with slender bodies, long tails and strong legs. Many are brood parasites.

- Greater coucal, Centropus sinensis
- Sirkeer malkoha, Taccocua leschenaultii
- Jacobin cuckoo, Clamator jacobinus
- Asian koel, Eudynamys scolopaceus
- Grey-bellied cuckoo, Cacomantis passerinus
- Fork-tailed drongo-cuckoo, Surniculus dicruroides (V)
- Common hawk-cuckoo, Hierococcyx varius
- Indian cuckoo, Cuculus micropterus
- Common cuckoo, Cuculus canorus

== Sandgrouse ==
Order: Pterocliformes Family: Pteroclidae

Sandgrouse have small, pigeon like heads and necks, but sturdy compact bodies. They have long pointed wings and sometimes tails and a fast direct flight. Flocks fly to watering holes at dawn and dusk. Their legs are feathered down to the toes.

- Chestnut-bellied sandgrouse, Pterocles exustus
- Painted sandgrouse, Pterocles indicus

== Pigeons and doves ==
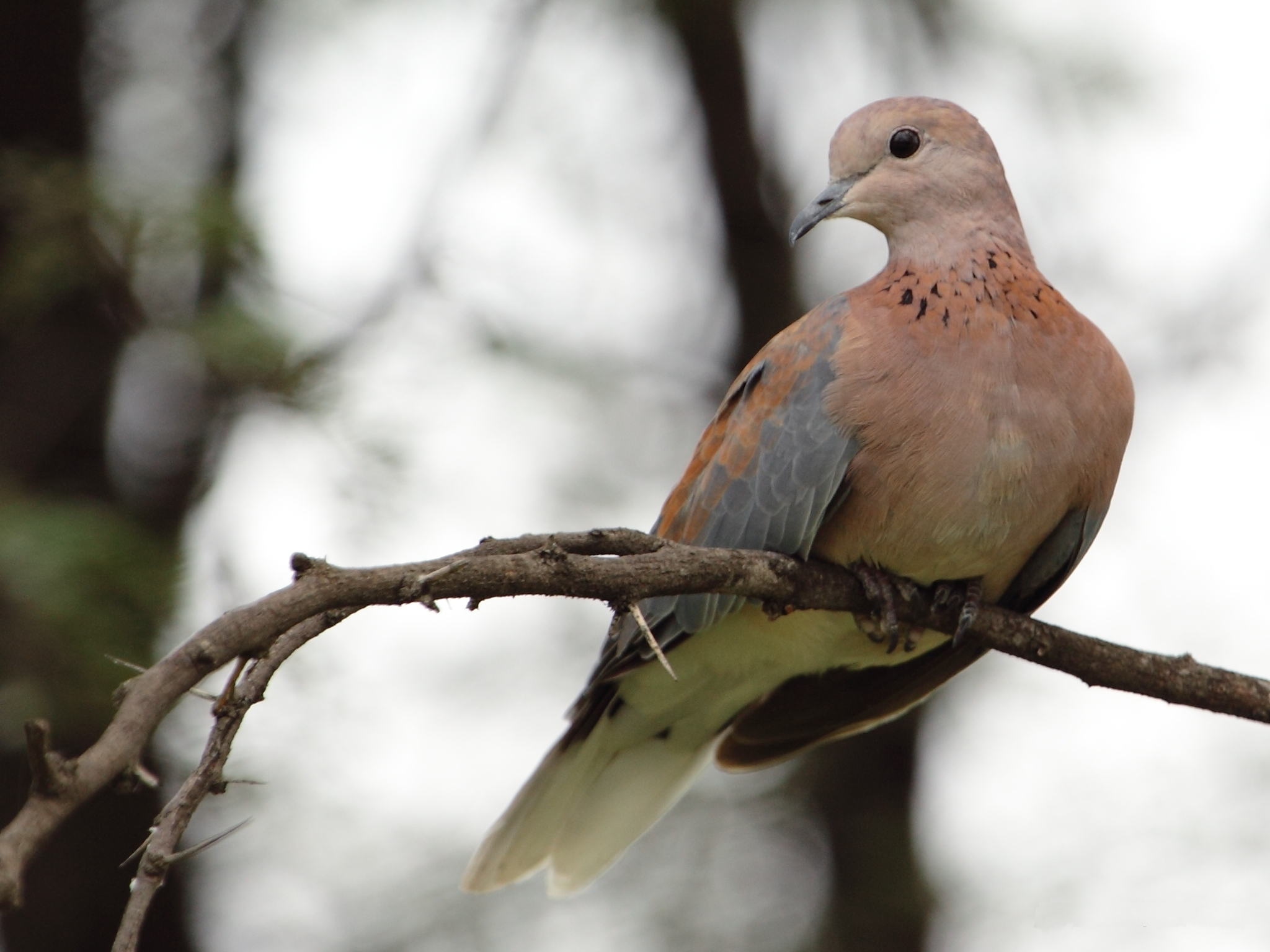
Laughing dove

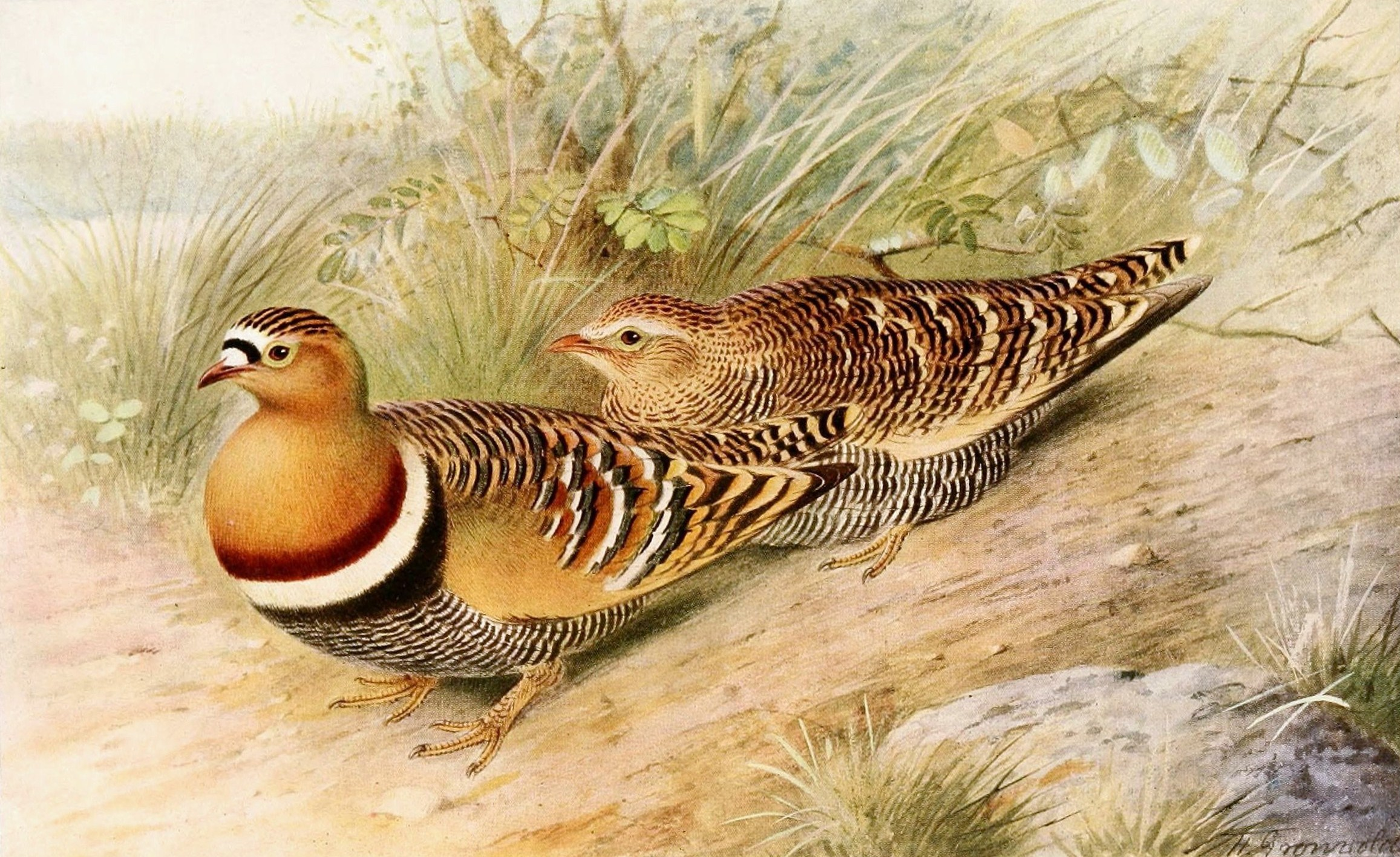
Painted sandgrouse

Order: Columbiformes Family: Columbidae

Pigeons and doves are stout-bodied birds with short necks and short slender bills with a fleshy cere.

- Rock dove, Columba livia
- Oriental turtle dove, Streptopelia orientalis
- Eurasian collared dove, Streptopelia decaocto
- Red collared dove, Streptopelia tranquebarica
- Spotted dove, Spilopelia chinensis
- Laughing dove, Spilopelia senegalensis
- Ashy-headed green pigeon, Treron phayrei (V)
- Yellow-footed green pigeon, Treron phoenicopterus

== Rails, crakes, and coots ==
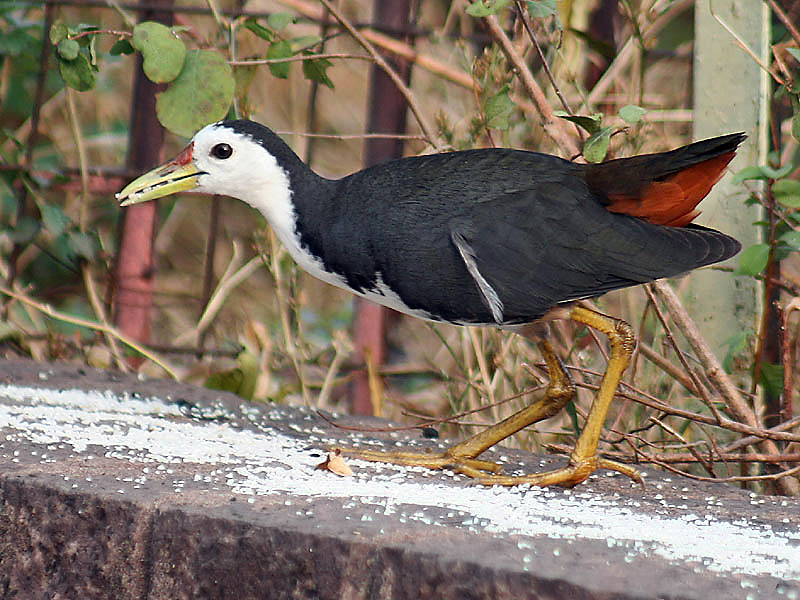
White-breasted waterhen

Order: Gruiformes Family: Rallidae

Rallidae is a large family of small to medium-sized birds which includes the rails, crakes, coots and gallinules. Typically they inhabit dense vegetation in damp environments near lakes, swamps or rivers. In general they are shy and secretive birds, making them difficult to observe. Most species have strong legs and long toes which are well adapted to soft uneven surfaces. They tend to have short, rounded wings and to be weak fliers.

- Water rail, Rallus aquaticus
- Spotted crake, Porzana porzana
- Common moorhen, Gallinula chloropus
- Eurasian coot, Fulica atra
- Grey-headed swamphen, Porphyrio poliocephalus
- Ruddy-breasted crake, Zapornia fusca
- Brown crake, Zapornia akool
- Baillon's crake, Zapornia pusilla
- Watercock, Gallicrex cinerea
- White-breasted waterhen, Amaurornis phoenicurus

== Cranes ==
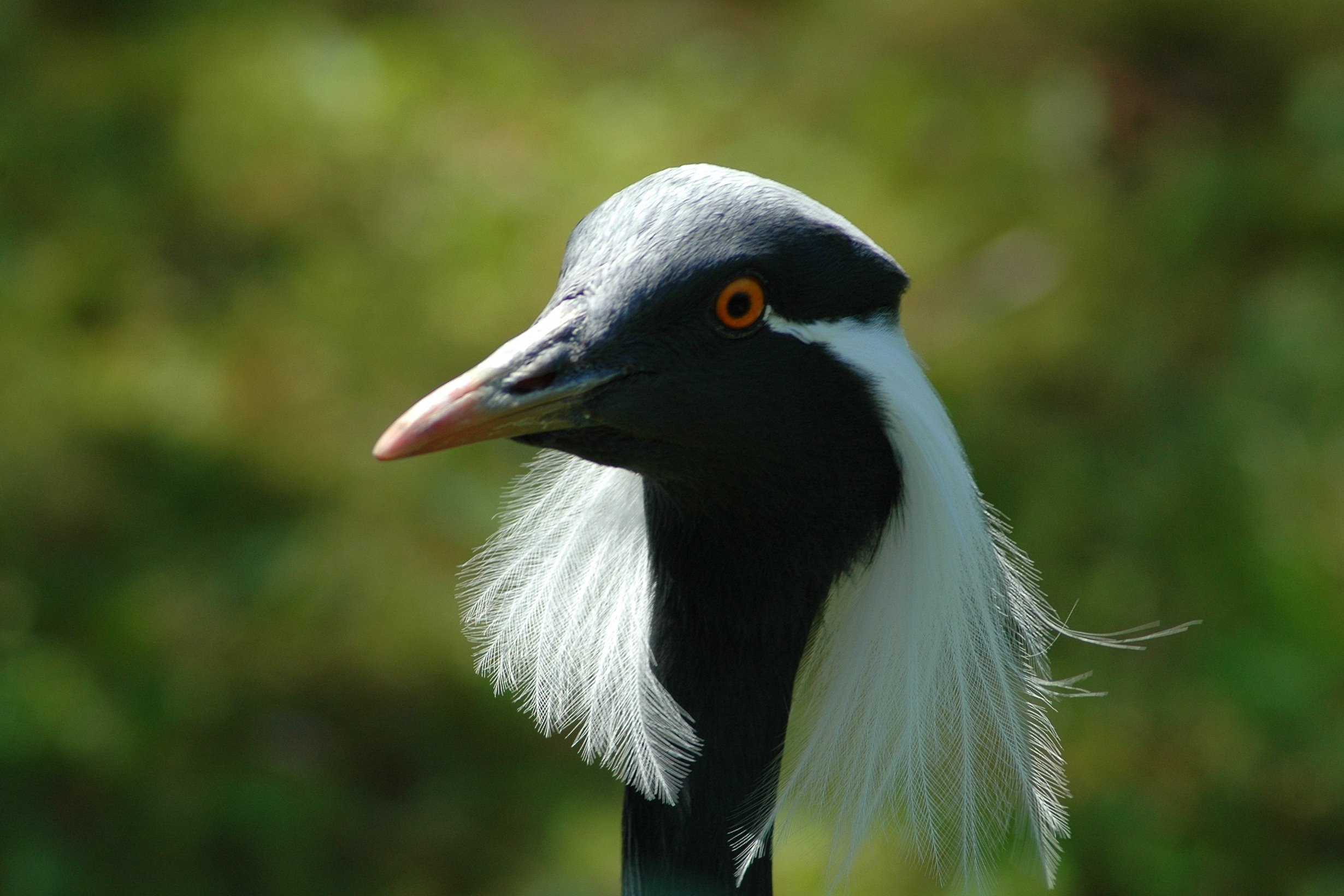
Demoiselle crane

Order: Gruiformes Family: Gruidae

Cranes are large, long-legged and long-necked birds. Unlike the similar-looking but unrelated herons, cranes fly with necks outstretched, not pulled back. Most have elaborate and noisy courting displays or "dances".

- Demoiselle crane, Grus virgo
- Common crane, Grus grus
- Sarus crane, Antigone antigone

== Grebes ==
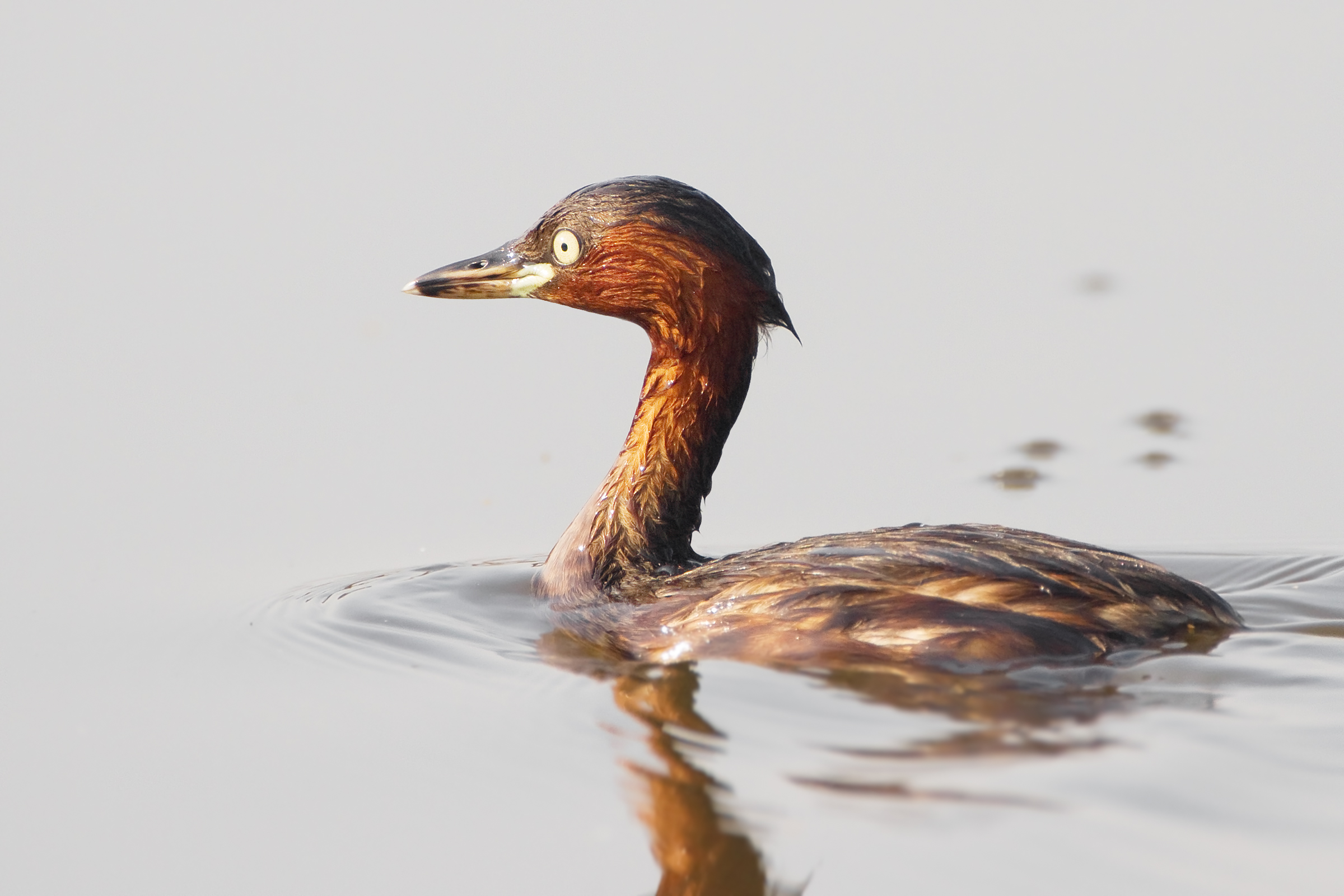
Little grebe

Order: Podicipediformes Family: Podicipedidae

Grebes are small to medium-large freshwater diving birds. They have lobed toes and are excellent swimmers and divers. However, they have their feet placed far back on the body, making them quite ungainly on land.

- Little grebe, Tachybaptus ruficollis
- Horned grebe, Podiceps auritus (V)
- Great crested grebe, Podiceps cristatus
- Black-necked grebe,Podiceps nigricollis

== Flamingos ==
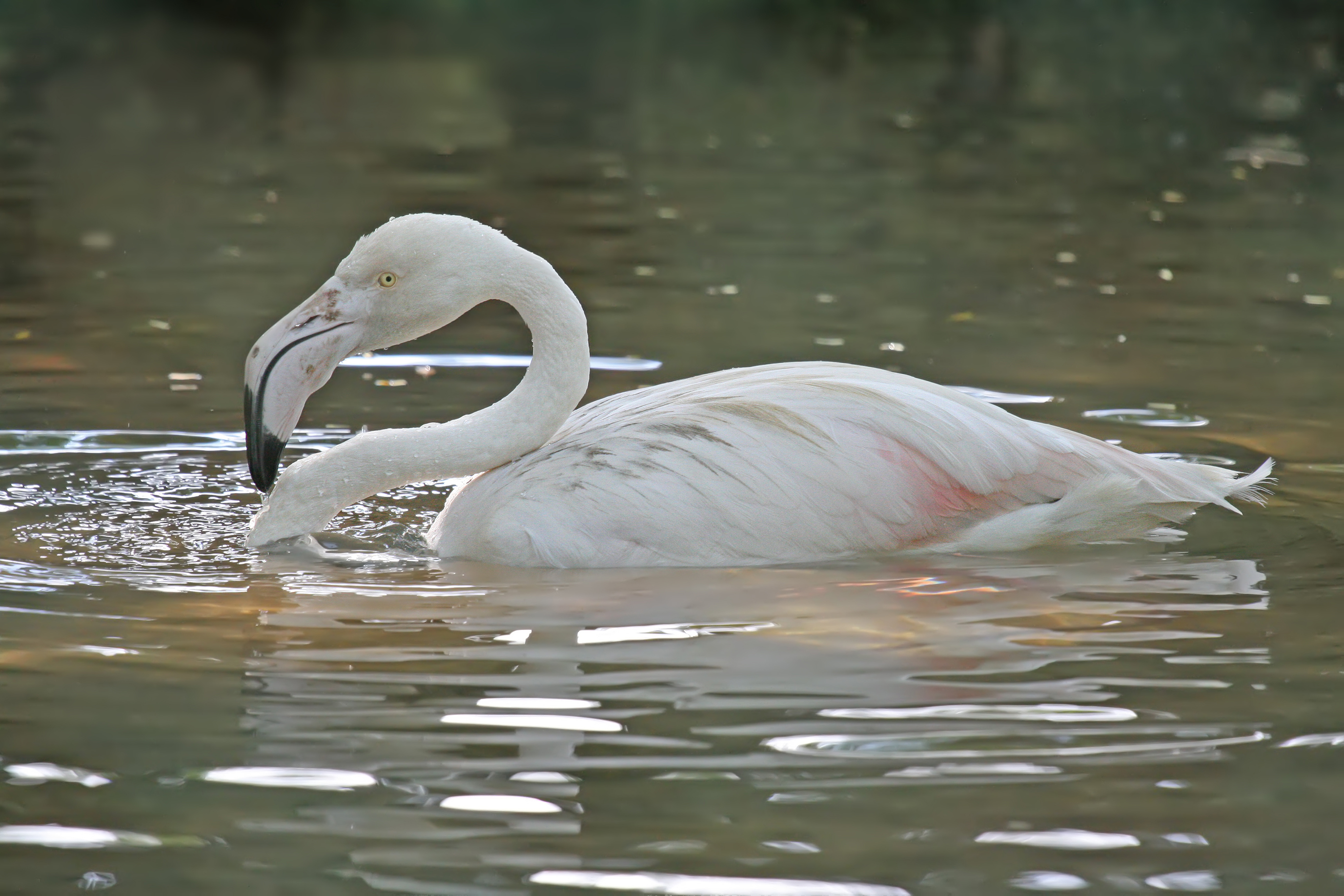
Greater flamingo

Order: Phoenicopteriformes Family: Phoenicopteridae

Flamingos are gregarious wading birds, usually 1 to 1.5 metres (3 to 5 ft) tall, found in both the Western and Eastern Hemispheres. Flamingos filter-feed on shellfish and algae. Their oddly shaped beaks are specially adapted to separate mud and silt from the food they consume and, uniquely, are used upside-down.

- Greater flamingo, Phoenicopterus roseus
- Lesser flamingo, Phoenicopterus minor(V)

== Buttonquail ==
Order: Charadriiformes Family: Turnicidae

The buttonquail are small, drab, running birds which resemble the true quails. The female is the brighter of the sexes and initiates courtship. The male incubates the eggs and tends the young.

- Common buttonquail, Turnix sylvaticus
- Yellow-legged buttonquail, Turnix tanki
- Barred buttonquail, Turnix suscitator

== Stone-curlews and thick-knees ==
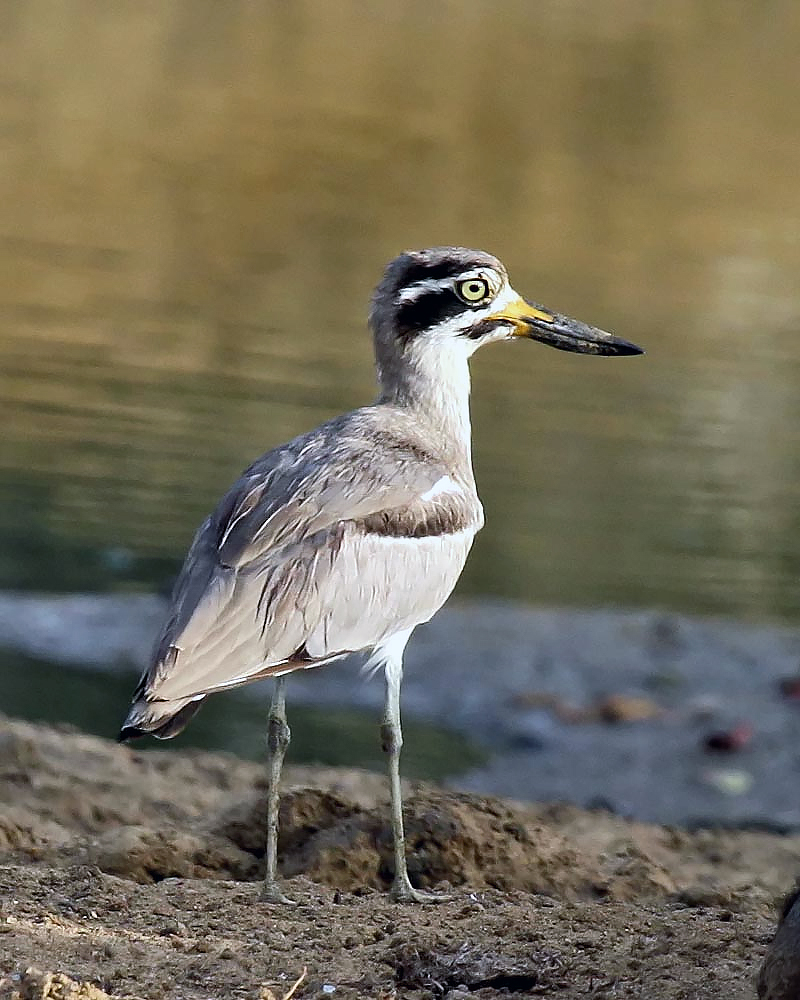
Great stone-curlew

Order: Charadriiformes Family: Burhinidae

The stone-curlews are a group of largely tropical waders in the family Burhinidae. They are found worldwide within the tropical zone, with some species also breeding in temperate Europe and Australia. They are medium to large waders with strong black or yellow-black bills, large yellow eyes and cryptic plumage. Despite being classed as waders, most species have a preference for arid or semi-arid habitats.

- Indian stone-curlew, Burhinus indicus
- Great stone-curlew, Esacus recurvirostris

== Stilts and avocets ==
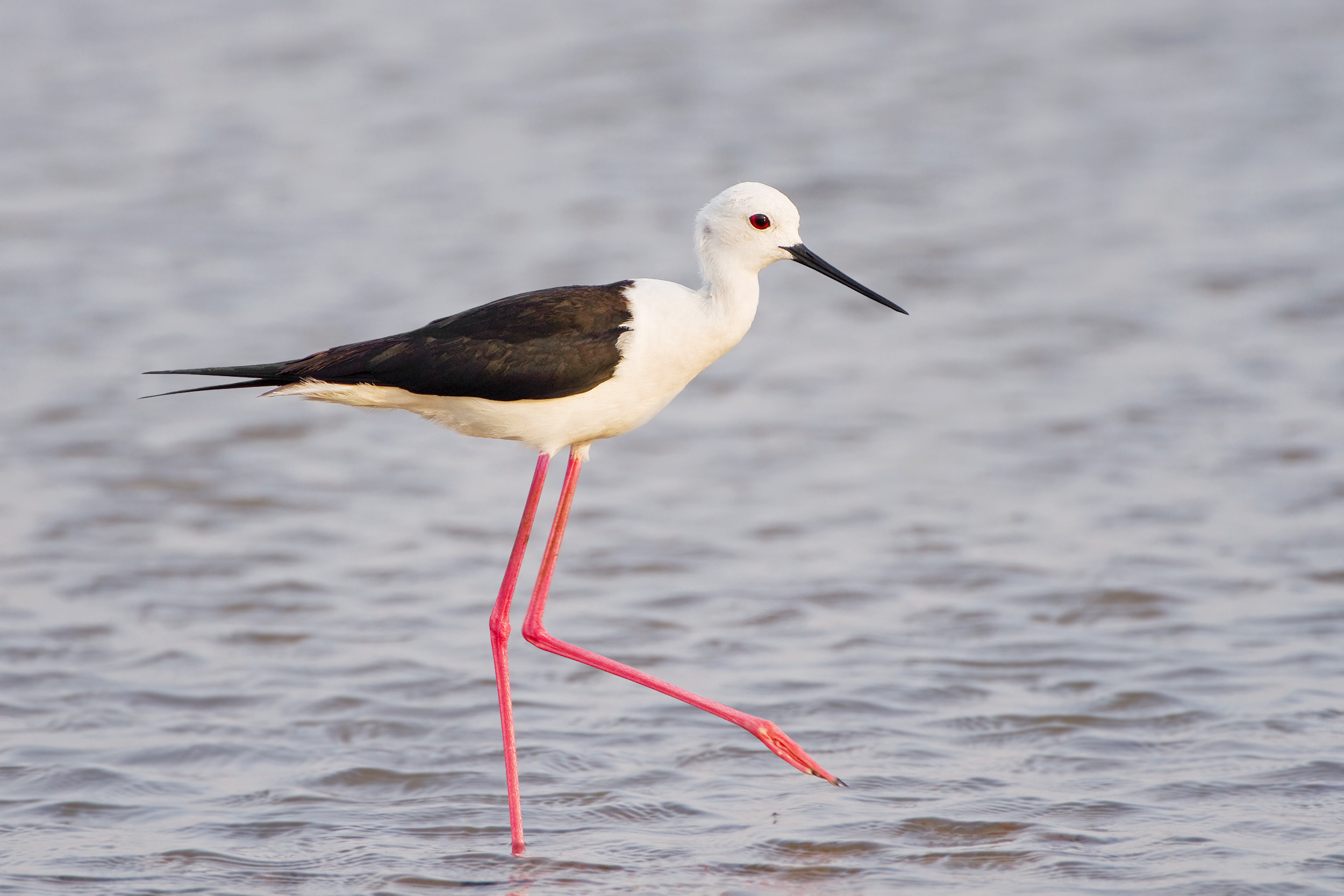
Black-winged stilt

Order: Charadriiformes Family: Recurvirostridae

Recurvirostridae is a family of large wading birds, which includes the avocets and stilts. The avocets have long legs and long up-curved bills. The stilts have extremely long legs and long, thin, straight bills.

- Black-winged stilt, Himantopus himantopus
- Pied avocet, Recurvirostra avosetta

== Plovers ==
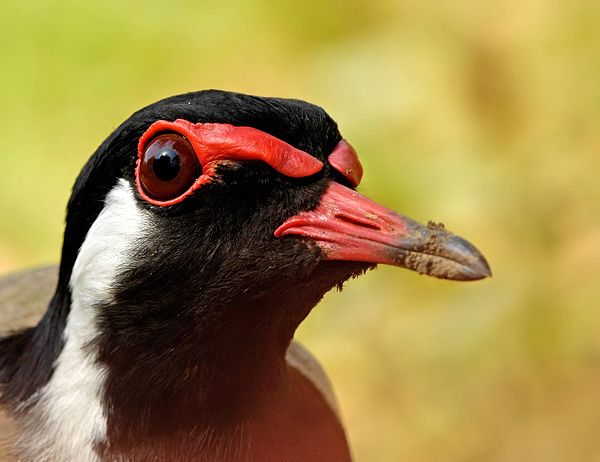
Red-wattled lapwing

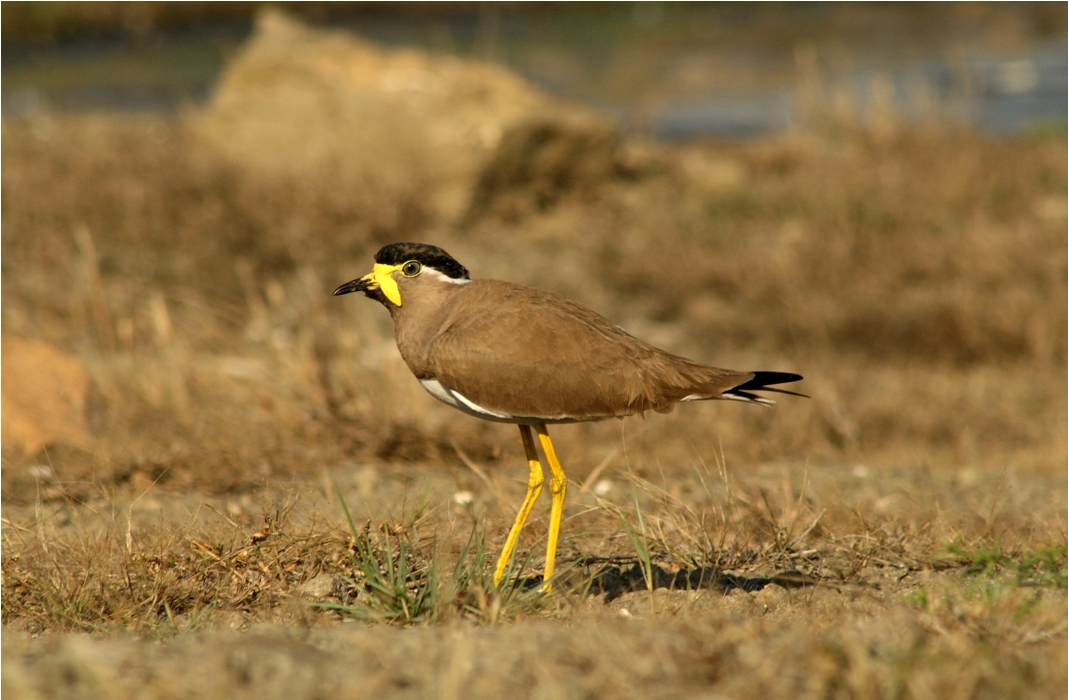
Yellow-wattled lapwing

Order: Charadriiformes Family: Charadriidae

The family Charadriidae includes the plovers, dotterels and lapwings. They are small to medium-sized birds with compact bodies, short, thick necks and long, usually pointed, wings. They are found in open country worldwide, mostly in habitats near water.

- River lapwing, Vanellus duvaucelii
- Yellow-wattled lapwing, Vanellus malabaricus
- Grey-headed lapwing, Vanellus cinereus
- Northern lapwing, Vanellus vanellus
- Red-wattled lapwing, Vanellus indicus
- Sociable lapwing, Vanellus gregarius
- White-tailed lapwing, Vanellus leucurus
- Pacific golden plover, Pluvialis fulva
- Grey plover, Pluvialis squatarola
- Caspian plover, Charadrius asiaticus (V)
- Common ringed plover, Charadrius hiaticula(V)
- Little ringed plover, Charadrius dubius
- Kentish plover, Charadrius alexandrinus
- Lesser sand plover, Charadrius mongolus
- Greater sand plover, Charadrius leschenaultii (V)

== Painted-snipes ==
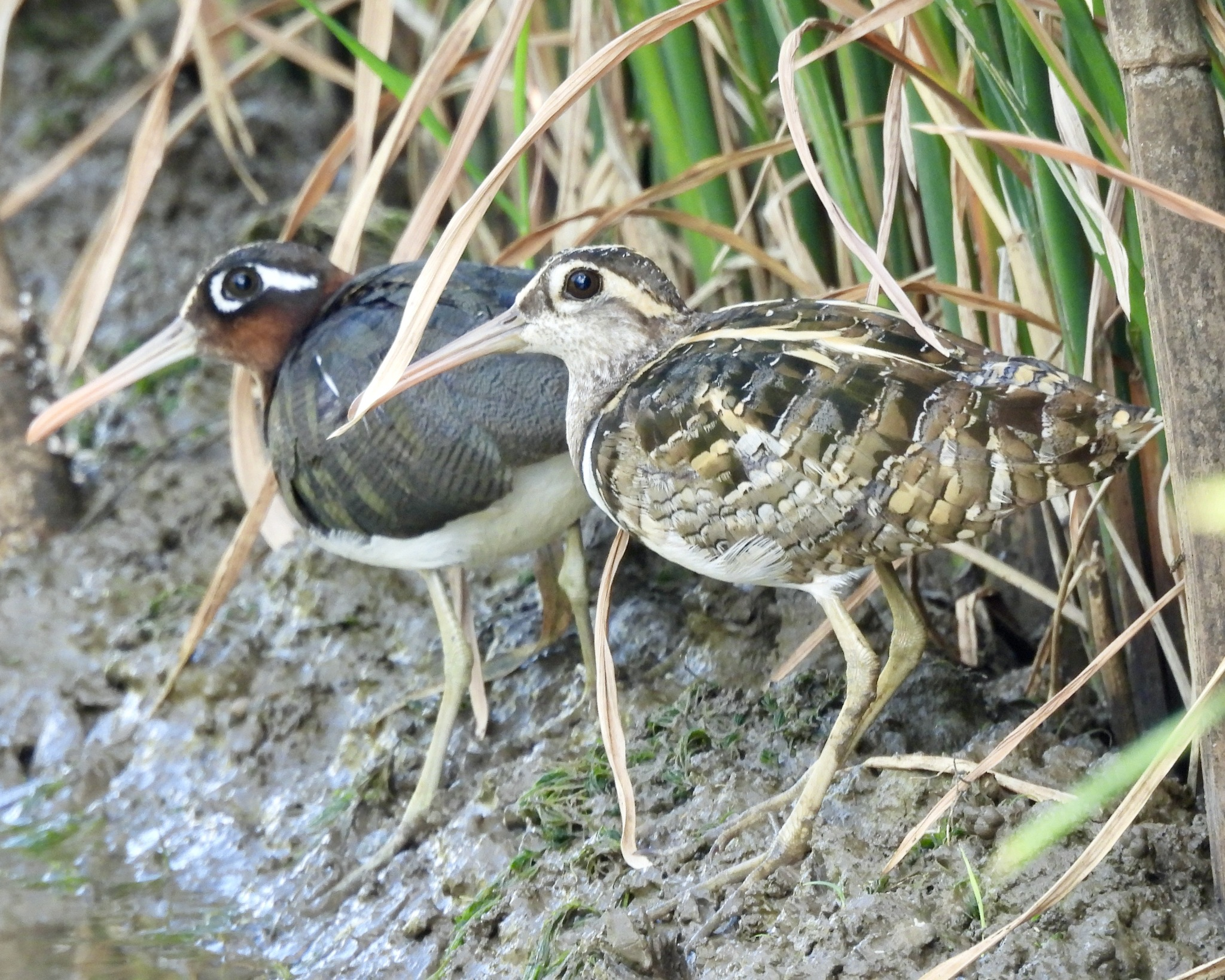
Greater painted-snipe

Order: Charadriiformes Family: Rostratulidae

Painted-snipes are short-legged, long-billed birds similar in shape to the true snipes, but more brightly coloured.

- Greater painted-snipe, Rostratula benghalensis

== Jacanas ==
Order: Charadriiformes Family: Jacanidae

The jacanas are a group of tropical waders in the family Jacanidae. They are found throughout the tropics. They are identifiable by their huge feet and claws which enable them to walk on floating vegetation in the shallow lakes that are their preferred habitat.

- Pheasant-tailed jacana, Hydrophasianus chirurgus
- Bronze-winged jacana, Metopidius indicus

== Sandpipers and snipes ==
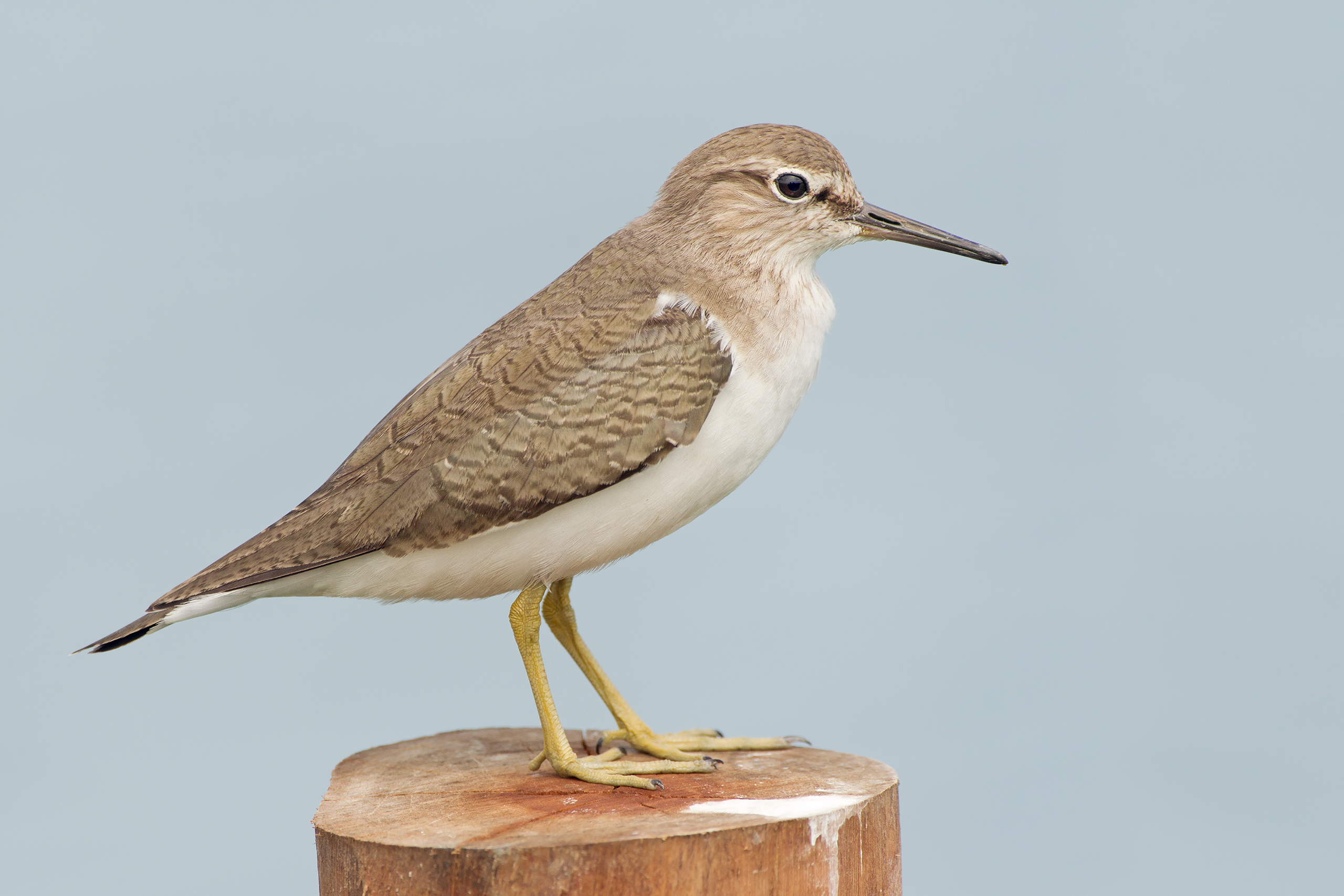
Common sandpiper

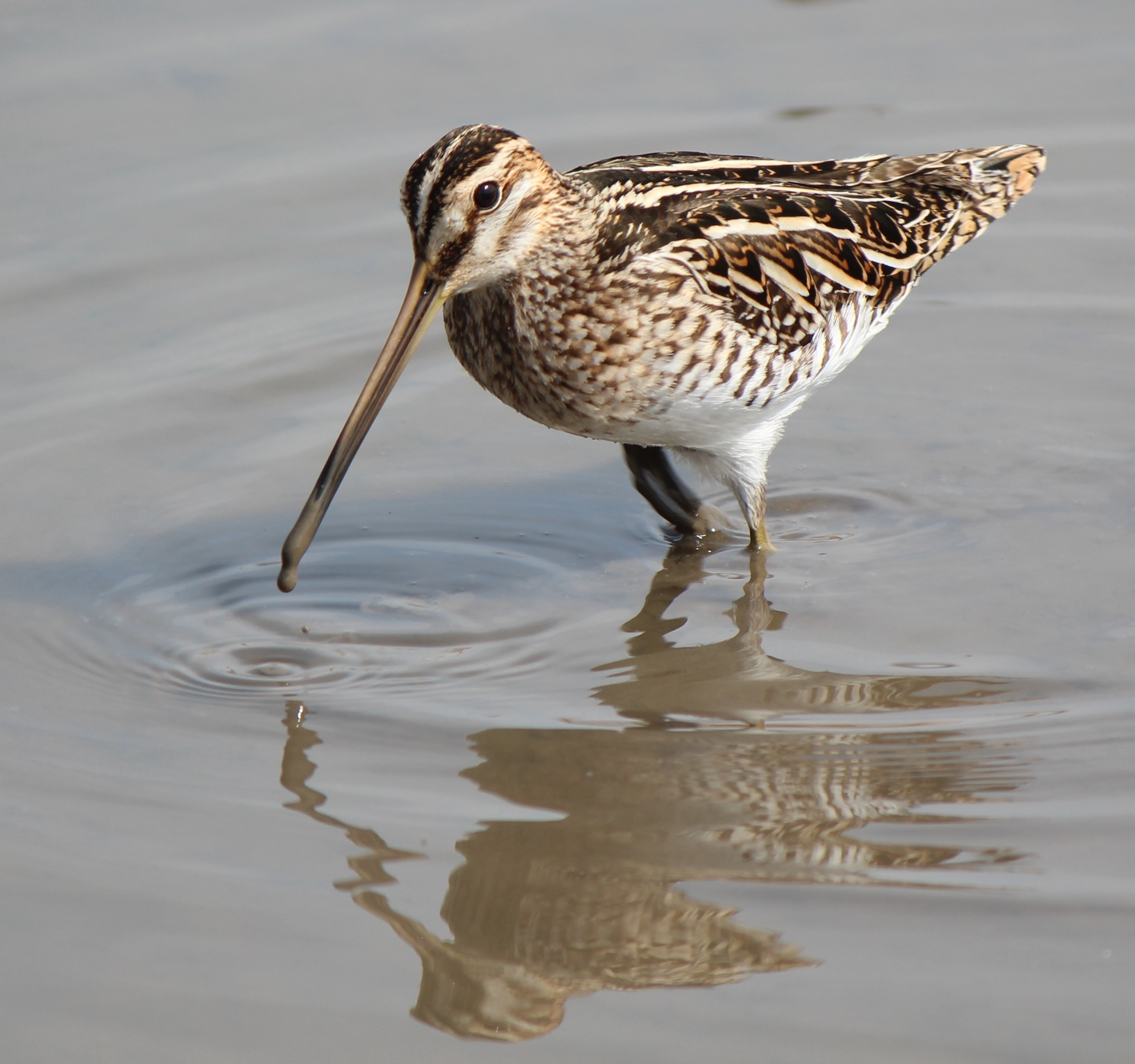
Common snipe

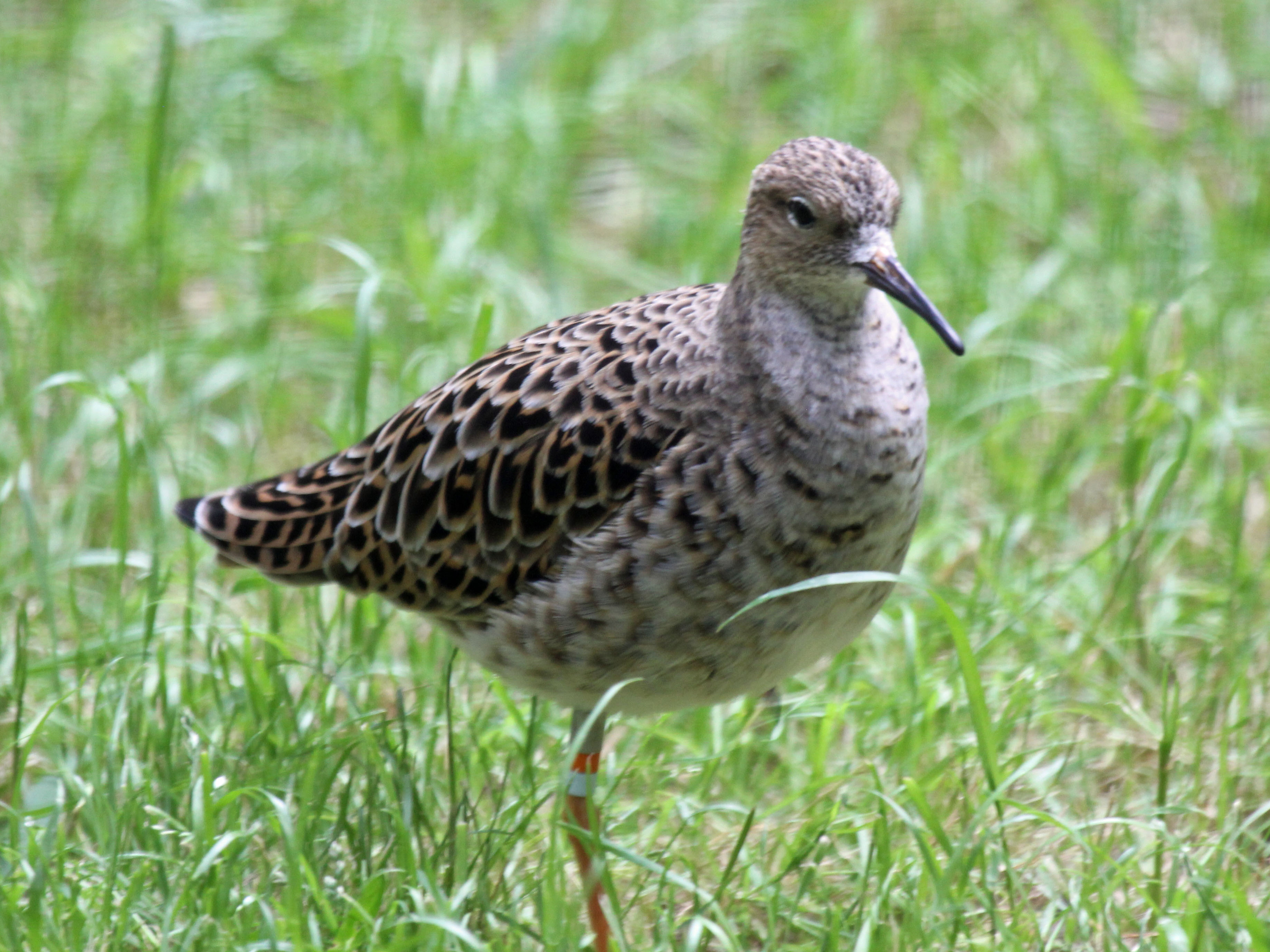
Ruff

Order: Charadriiformes Family: Scolopacidae

Scolopacidae is a large diverse family of small to medium-sized shorebirds including the sandpipers, curlews, godwits, shanks, tattlers, woodcocks, snipes, dowitchers and phalaropes. The majority of these species eat small invertebrates picked out of the mud or soil. Variation in length of legs and bills enables multiple species to feed in the same habitat, particularly on the coast, without direct competition for food.

- Eurasian whimbrel, Numenius phaeopus
- Eurasian curlew, Numenius arquata
- Bar-tailed godwit, Limosa lapponica (V)
- Black-tailed godwit, Limosa limosa
- Ruddy turnstone, Arenaria interpres (V)
- Ruff, Calidris pugnax
- Curlew sandpiper, Calidris ferruginea
- Broad-billed sandpiper, Calidris falcinellus(V)
- Sharp-tailed sandpiper, Calidris acuminata (V)
- Temminck's stint, Calidris temminckii
- Dunlin, Calidris alpina
- Little stint, Calidris minuta
- Asian dowitcher, Limnodromus semipalmatus (V)
- Long-billed dowitcher, Limnodromus scolopaceus(V)
- Jack snipe, Lymnocryptes minimus
- Pin-tailed snipe, Gallinago stenura
- Common snipe, Gallinago gallinago
- Terek sandpiper, Xenus cinereus (V)
- Red-necked phalarope, Phalaropus lobatus (V)
- Common sandpiper, Actitis hypoleucos
- Green sandpiper, Tringa ochropus
- Common redshank, Tringa totanus
- Marsh sandpiper, Tringa stagnatilis
- Wood sandpiper, Tringa glareola
- Spotted redshank, Tringa erythropus
- Common greenshank, Tringa nebularia

== Coursers and pratincoles ==
Order: Charadriiformes Family: Glareolidae

Glareolidae is a family of wading birds comprising the pratincoles, which have short legs, long, pointed wings and long, forked tails, and the coursers, which have long legs, short wings and long, pointed bills which curve downwards.

- Indian courser, Cursorius coromandelicus
- Cream-coloured courser, Cursorius cursor (V)
- Oriental pratincole, Glareola maldivarum
- Small pratincole, Glareola lactea

== Gulls, terns, and skimmers ==
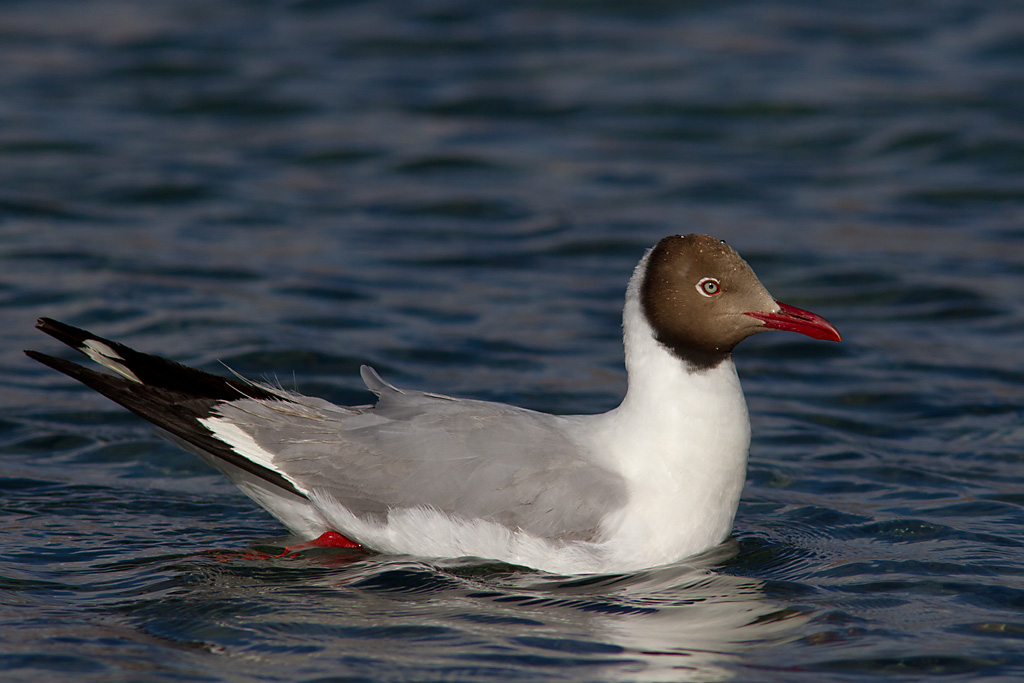
Brown-headed gull

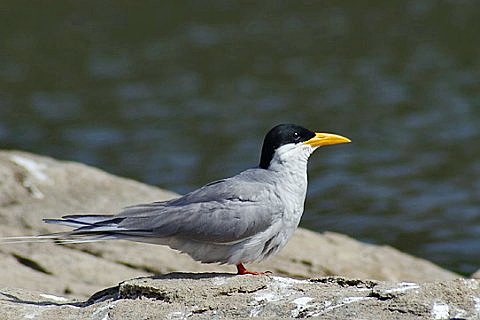
River tern

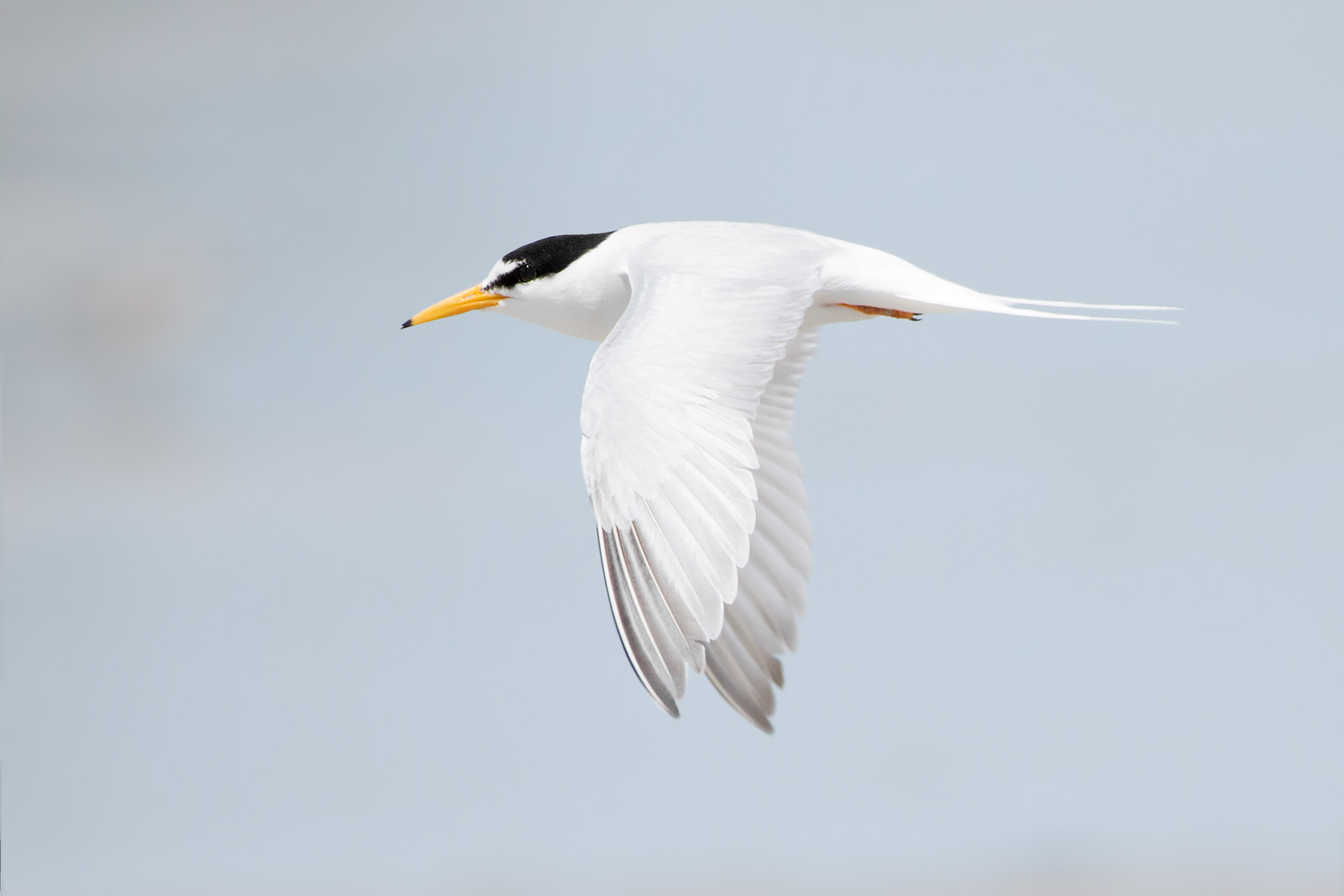
Little tern

Order: Charadriiformes Family: Laridae

Laridae is a family of medium to large seabirds, the gulls, terns, and skimmers. Gulls are typically grey or white, often with black markings on the head or wings. They have stout, longish bills and webbed feet. Terns are a group of generally medium to large seabirds typically with grey or white plumage, often with black markings on the head. Most terns hunt fish by diving but some pick insects off the surface of fresh water. Terns are generally long-lived birds, with several species known to live in excess of 30 years.

- Indian skimmer, Rynchops albicollis
- Slender-billed gull, Chroicocephalus genei (V)
- Brown-headed gull, Chroicocephalus brunnicephalus
- Black-headed gull, Chroicocephalus ridibundus
- Little gull, Hydrocoloeus minutus (V)
- Pallas's gull, Ichthyaetus ichthyaetus
- Common gull, Larus canus (V)
- Caspian gull, Larus cachinnans
- Lesser black-backed gull, Larus fuscus
- Gull-billed tern, Gelochelidon nilotica
- Caspian tern, Hydroprogne caspia (V)
- Little tern, Sternula albifrons
- Black tern, Chlidonias niger (V)
- River tern, Sterna aurantia
- Common tern, Sterna hirundo (V)
- Black-bellied tern, Sterna acuticauda
- Whiskered tern, Chlidonias hybrida
- White-winged tern, Chlidonias leucopterus

== Storks ==
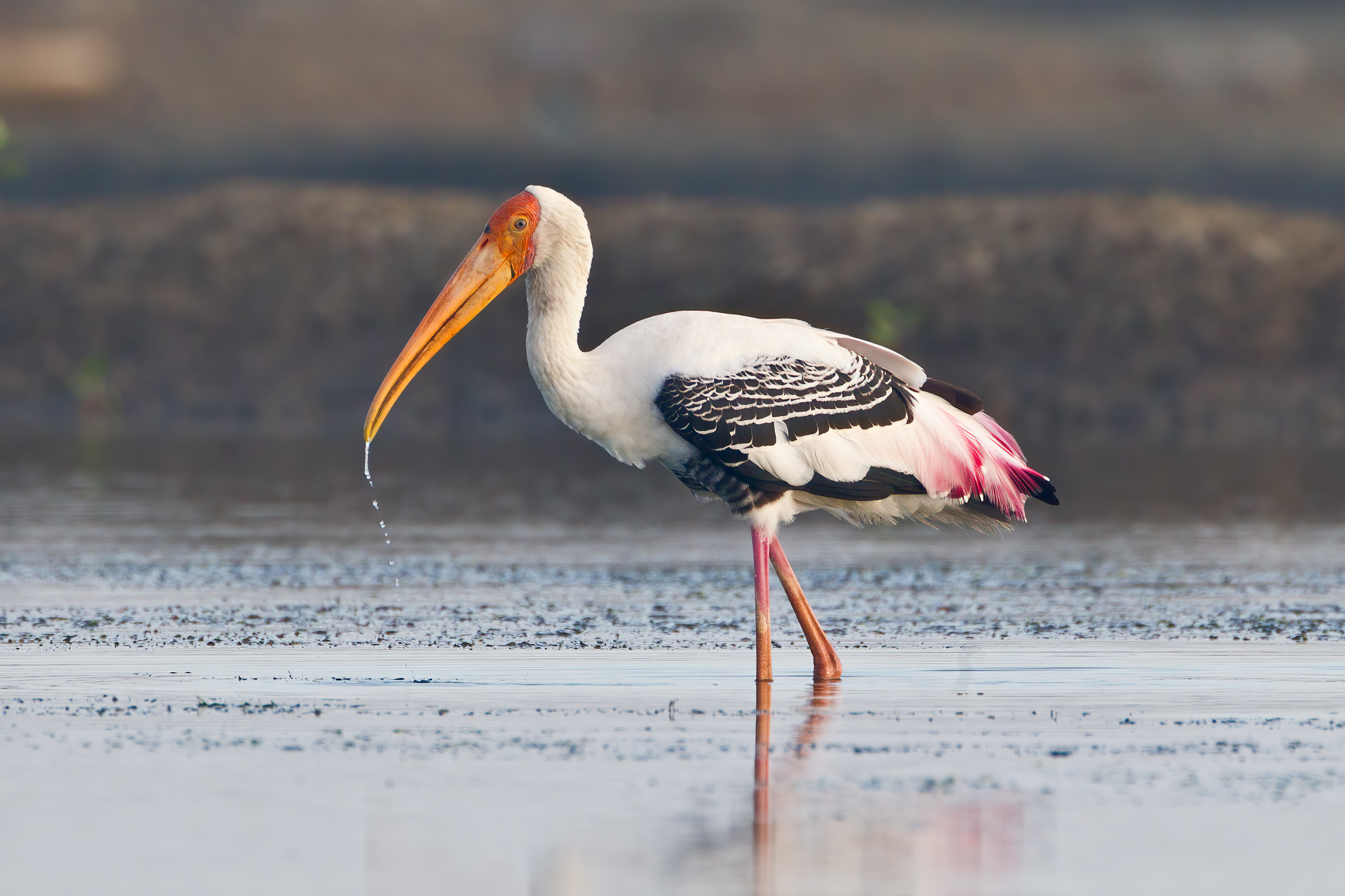
Painted stork

Order: Ciconiiformes Family: Ciconiidae

Storks are large, long-legged, long-necked, wading birds with long, stout bills. Storks are mute, but bill-clattering is an important mode of communication at the nest. Their nests can be large and may be reused for many years. Many species are migratory.

- Painted stork, Mycteria leucocephala
- Asian openbill, Anastomus oscitans
- Black stork, Ciconia nigra
- Woolly-necked stork, Ciconia episcopus
- White stork, Ciconia ciconia
- Black-necked stork, Ephippiorhynchus asiaticus
- Greater adjutant, Leptoptilos dubius

== Anhingas and darters ==
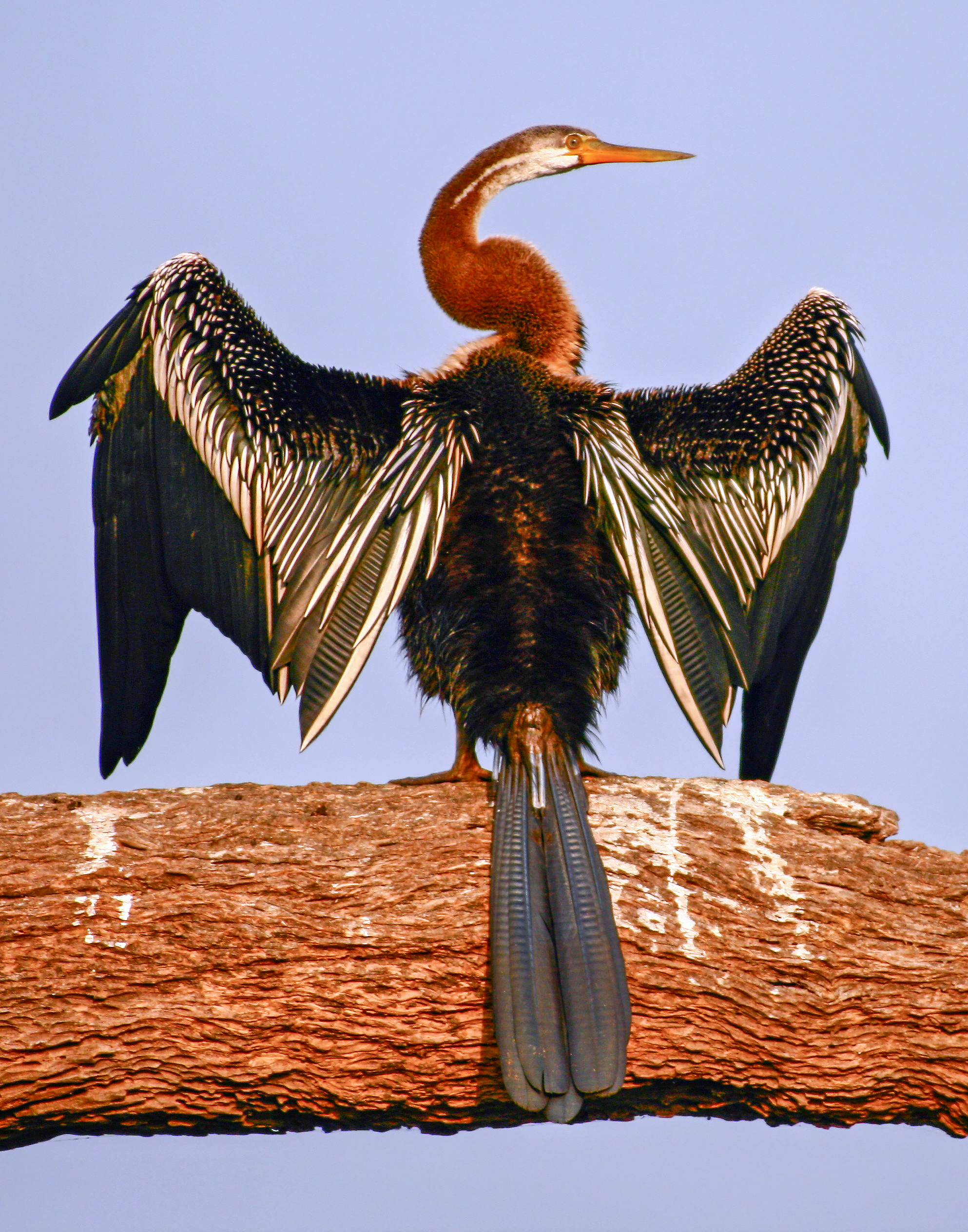
Oriental darter

Order: Suliformes Family: Anhingidae

Anhingas and darters are often called "snake-birds" because of their long thin neck, which gives a snake-like appearance when they swim with their bodies submerged. The males have black and dark-brown plumage, an erectile crest on the nape and a larger bill than the female. The females have much paler plumage especially on the neck and underparts. The darters have completely webbed feet and their legs are short and set far back on the body. Their plumage is somewhat permeable, like that of cormorants, and they spread their wings to dry after diving.

- Oriental darter, Anhinga melanogaster

== Cormorants and shags ==
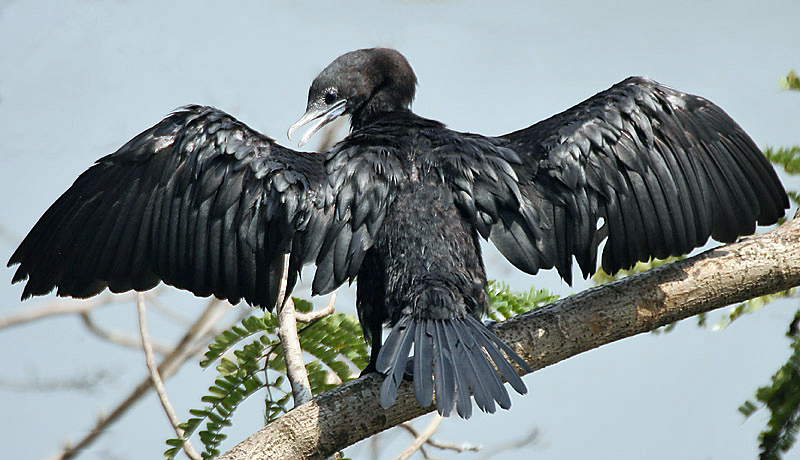
Little cormorant

Order: Suliformes Family: Phalacrocoracidae

Phalacrocoracidae is a family of medium to large coastal, fish-eating seabirds that includes cormorants and shags. Plumage colouration varies, with the majority having mainly dark plumage, some species being black-and-white and a few being colourful.

- Little cormorant, Microcarbo niger
- Indian cormorant, Phalacrocorax fuscicollis
- Great cormorant, Phalacrocorax carbo

== Ibises and spoonbills ==
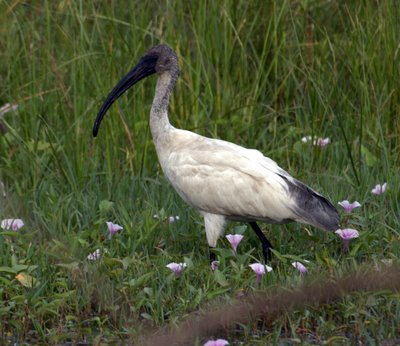
Black-headed ibis

Order: Pelecaniformes Family: Threskiornithidae

Threskiornithidae is a family of large terrestrial and wading birds which includes the ibises and spoonbills. They have long, broad wings with 11 primary and about 20 secondary feathers. They are strong fliers and despite their size and weight, very capable soarers.

- Black-headed ibis, Threskiornis melanocephalus
- Red-naped ibis, Pseudibis papillosa
- Glossy ibis, Plegadis falcinellus
- Eurasian spoonbill, Platalea leucorodia

== Herons and bitterns ==
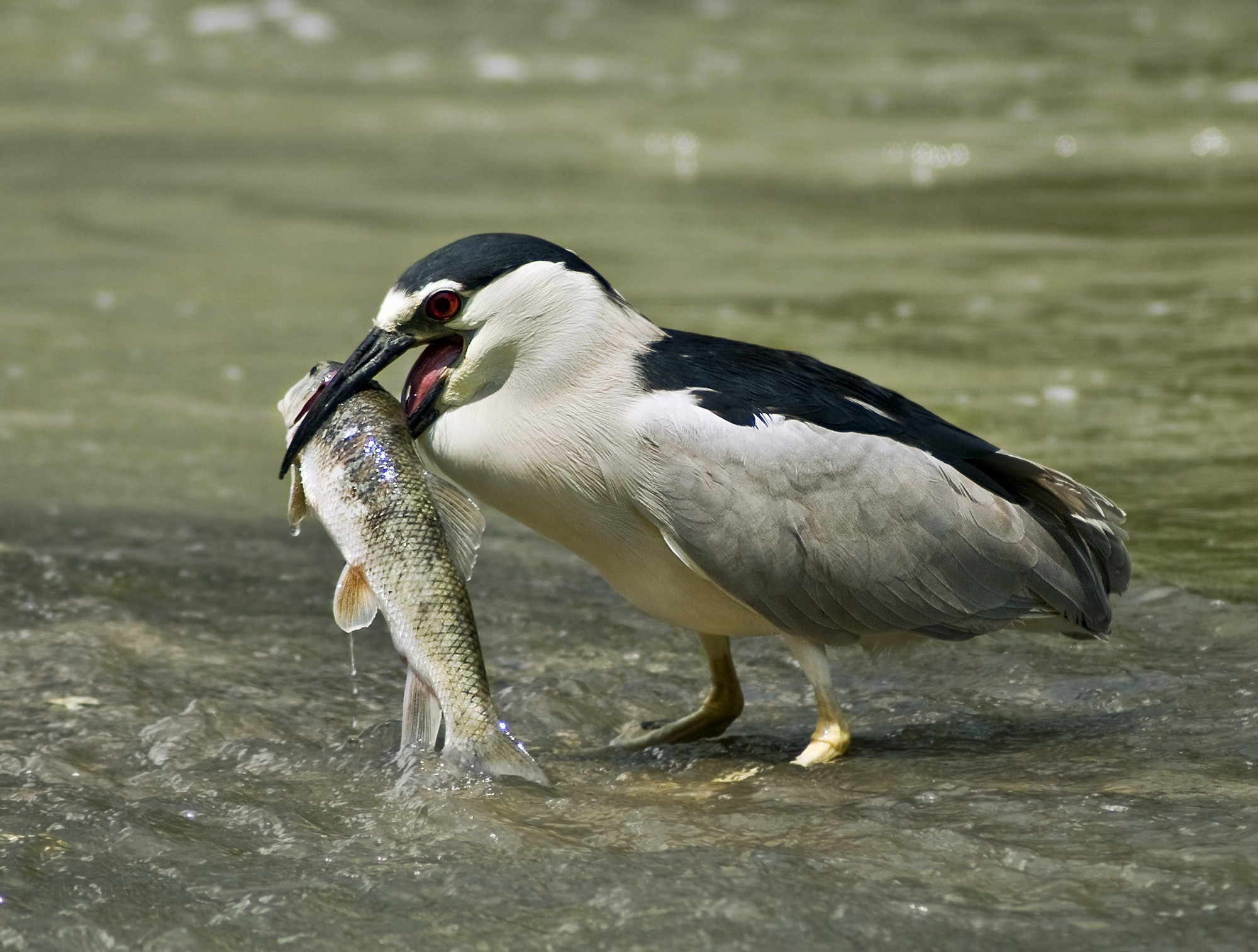
Black-crowned night heron

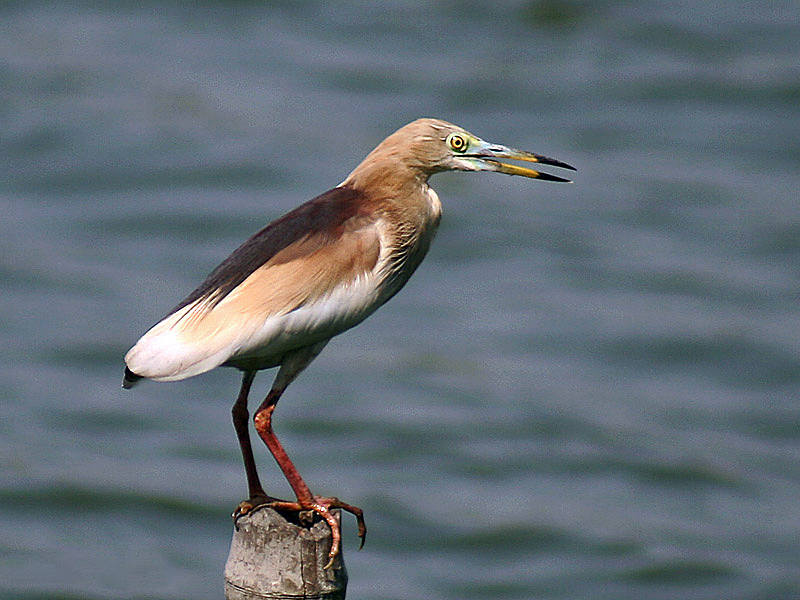
Indian pond heron

Order: Pelecaniformes Family: Ardeidae

The family Ardeidae contains the bitterns, herons and egrets. Herons and egrets are medium to large wading birds with long necks and legs. Bitterns tend to be shorter-necked and more wary. Members of Ardeidae fly with their necks retracted, unlike other long-necked birds such as storks, ibises and spoonbills.

- Eurasian bittern, Botaurus stellaris
- Little bittern, Ixobrychus minutus
- Yellow bittern, Ixobrychus sinensis
- Cinnamon bittern, Ixobrychus cinnamomeus
- Black bittern, Ixobrychus flavicollis
- Black-crowned night heron, Nycticorax nycticorax
- Striated heron, Butorides striata
- Indian pond heron, Ardeola grayii
- Eastern cattle egret, Bubulcus coromandus
- Grey heron, Ardea cinerea
- Purple heron, Ardea purpurea
- Great egret, Ardea alba
- Intermediate egret, Ardea intermedia
- Little egret, Egretta garzetta
- Western reef heron, Egretta gularis (V)

== Pelicans ==
Order: Pelecaniformes Family: Pelecanidae

Pelicans are large water birds with a distinctive pouch under their beak. As with other members of the order Pelecaniformes, they have webbed feet with four toes.

- Great white pelican, Pelecanus onocrotalus
- Dalmatian pelican, Pelecanus crispus

== Osprey ==
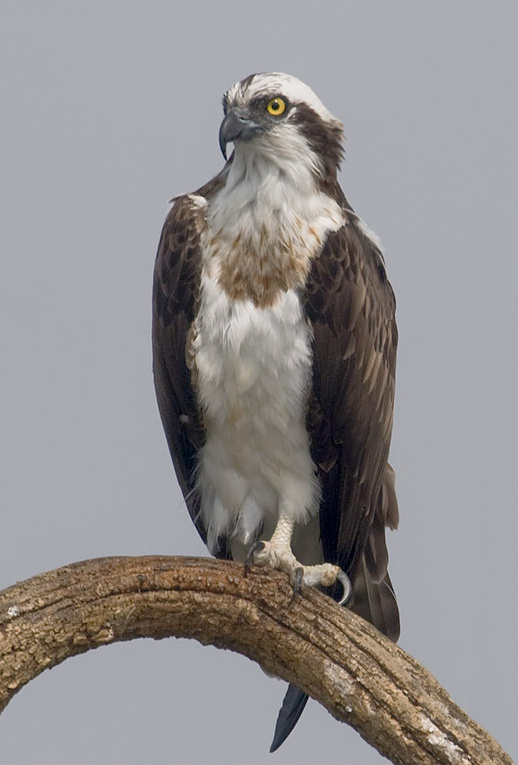
Western osprey

Order: Accipitriformes Family: Pandionidae

The family Pandionidae contains usually only one species, the osprey. The osprey is a medium-large raptor which is a specialist fish-eater.

- Osprey, Pandion haliaetus

== Kites, hawks, and eagles ==
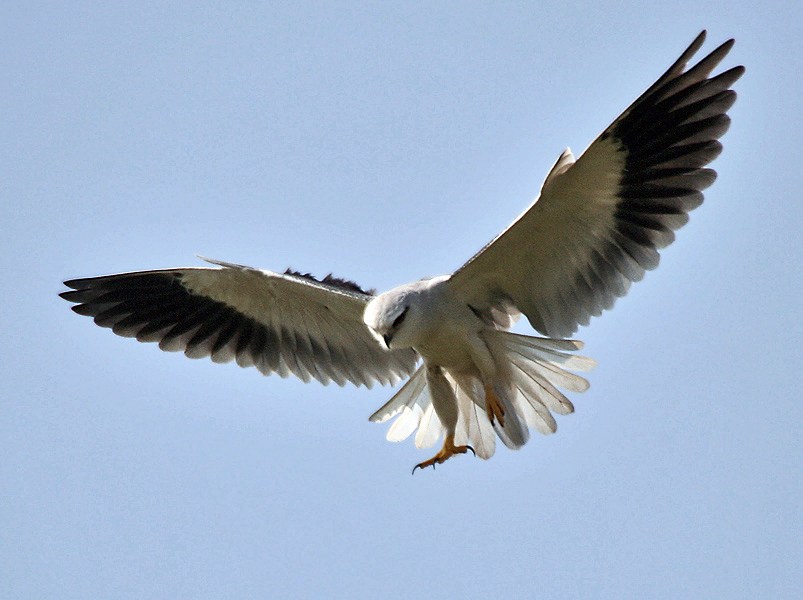
Black-winged kite

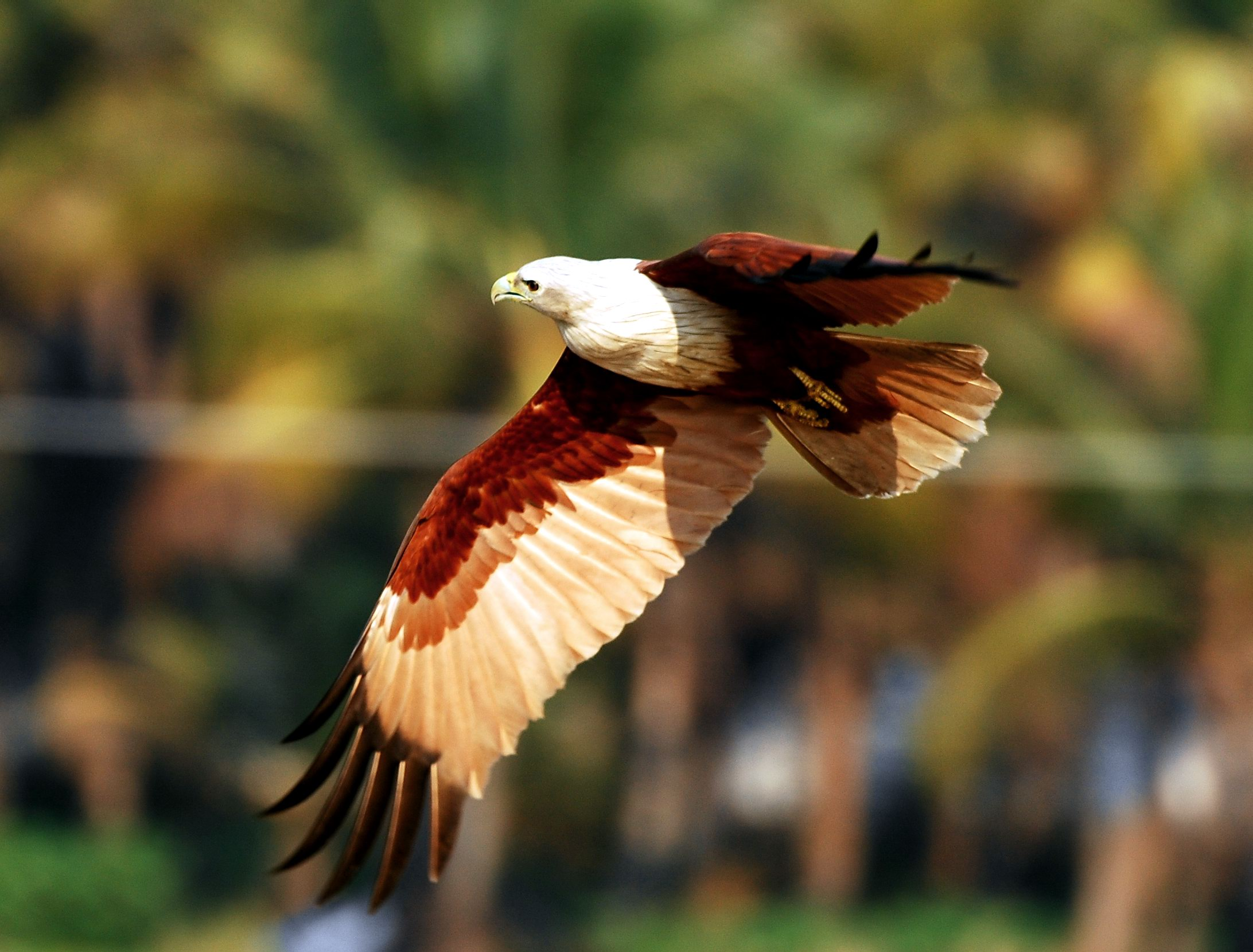
Brahminy kite

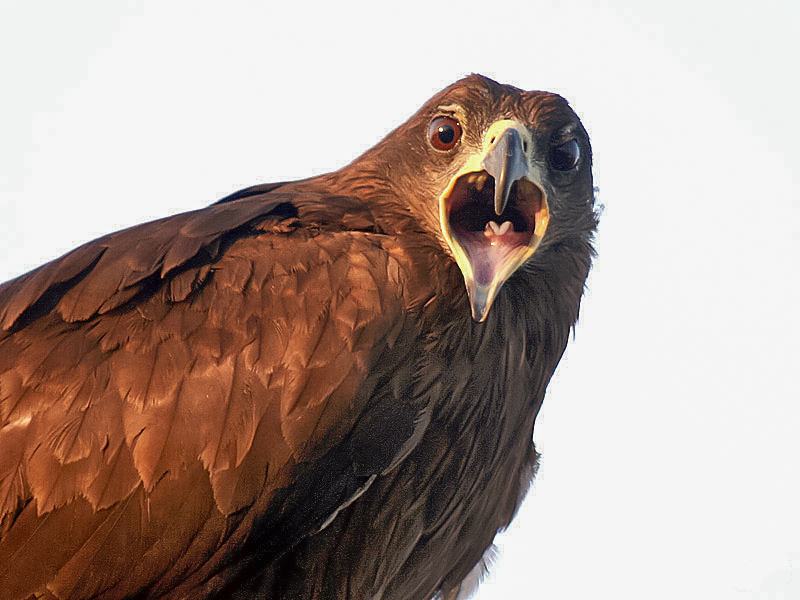
Black kite

Order: Accipitriformes Family: Accipitridae

Accipitridae is a family of birds of prey, which includes hawks, eagles, kites, harriers and Old World vultures. These birds have powerful hooked beaks for tearing flesh from their prey, strong legs, powerful talons and keen eyesight.

- Black-winged kite, Elanus caeruleus
- Egyptian vulture, Neophron percnopterus
- Crested honey buzzard, Pernis ptilorhynchus
- White-rumped vulture, Gyps bengalensis
- Indian vulture, Gyps indicus
- Himalayan griffon, Gyps himalayensis
- Griffon vulture, Gyps fulvus
- Red-headed vulture, Sarcogyps calvus
- Crested serpent eagle, Spilornis cheela
- Short-toed snake eagle, Circaetus gallicus
- Black eagle, Ictinaetus malayensis
- Indian spotted eagle, Clanga hastata
- Greater spotted eagle, Clanga clanga
- Booted eagle, Hieraaetus pennatus
- Tawny eagle, Aquila rapax
- Steppe eagle, Aquila nipalensis
- Eastern imperial eagle, Aquila heliaca
- Bonelli's eagle, Aquila fasciata
- Shikra, Tachyspiza badia
- Besra, Tachyspiza virgata
- Eurasian sparrowhawk, Accipiter nisus
- Eurasian goshawk, Astur gentilis (V)
- Western marsh harrier, Circus aeruginosus
- Hen harrier, Circus cyaneus
- Pallid harrier, Circus macrourus
- Pied harrier, Circus melanoleucos (V)
- Montagu's harrier, Circus pygargus
- Black kite, Milvus migrans
- Brahminy kite, Haliastur indus
- Grey-headed fish eagle, Haliaeetus ichthyaetus
- White-tailed eagle, Haliaeetus albicilla
- Pallas's fish eagle, Haliaeetus leucoryphus
- Lesser fish eagle, Icthyophaga humilis
- White-eyed buzzard, Butastur teesa
- Long-legged buzzard, Buteo rufinus
- Common buzzard, Buteo buteo

== Barn owls ==
Order: Strigiformes Family: Tytonidae

Barn owls are medium to large owls with large heads and characteristic heart-shaped faces. They have long strong legs with powerful talons.

- Eastern barn owl, Tyto javanica

== Owls ==
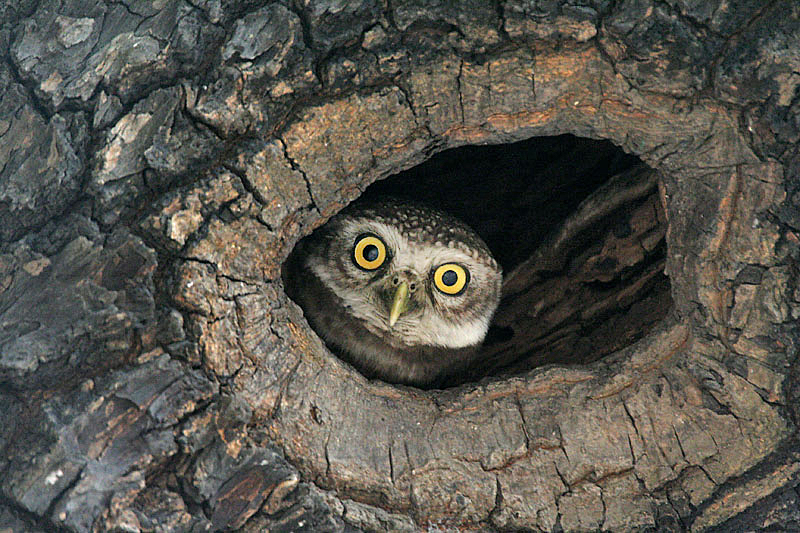
Spotted owlet

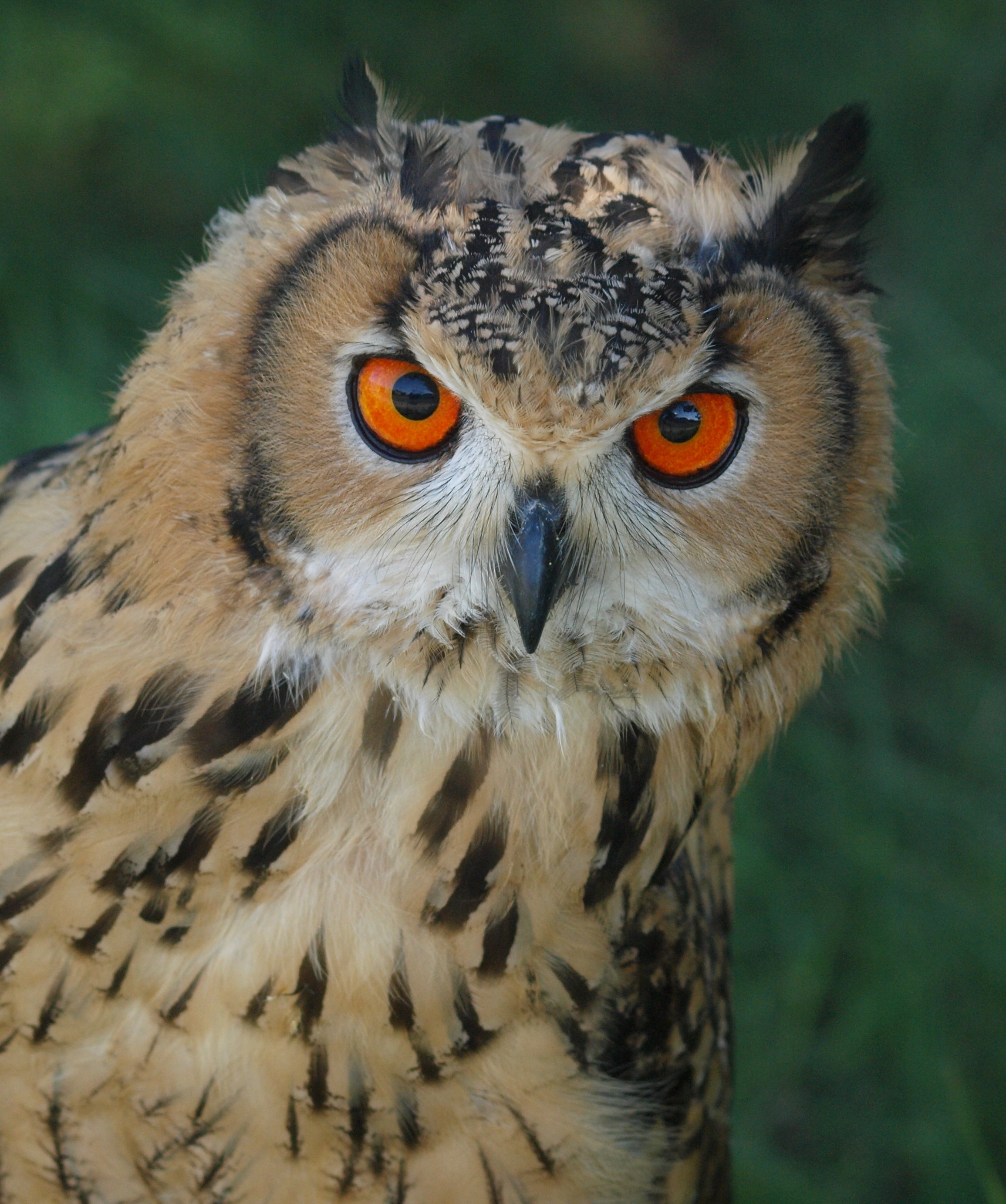
Indian eagle-owl

Order: Strigiformes Family: Strigidae

The typical owls are small to large solitary nocturnal birds of prey. They have large forward-facing eyes and ears, a hawk-like beak and a conspicuous circle of feathers around each eye called a facial disk.

- Indian scops owl, Otus bakkamoena
- Pallid scops owl, Otus brucei
- Oriental scops owl, Otus sunia
- Indian eagle-owl, Bubo bengalensis
- Dusky eagle-owl, Ketupa coromandra
- Brown fish owl, Ketupa zeylonensis
- Spotted owlet, Athene brama
- Brown boobook, Ninox scutulata
- Short-eared owl, Asio flammeus
- Long-eared owl, Asio otus (V)

== Hoopoes ==
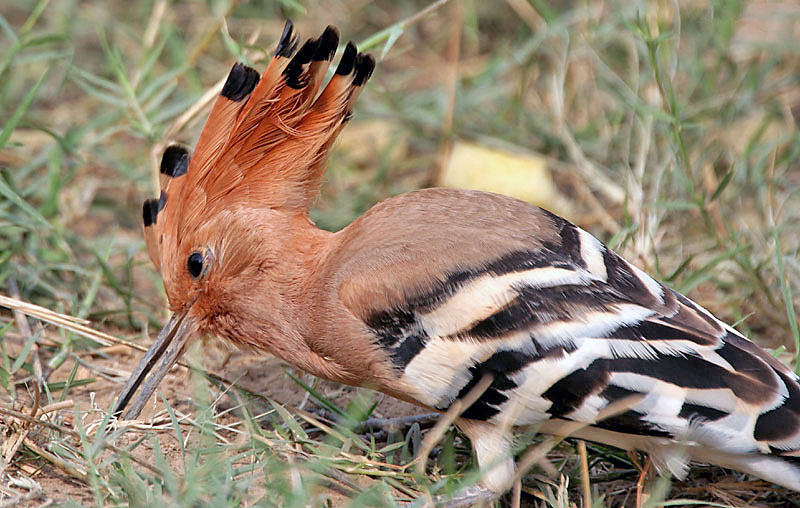
Eurasian hoopoe

Order: Bucerotiformes Family: Upupidae

Hoopoes have black, white and orangey-pink colouring with a large erectile crest on their head.

- Eurasian hoopoe, Upupa epops

== Hornbills ==
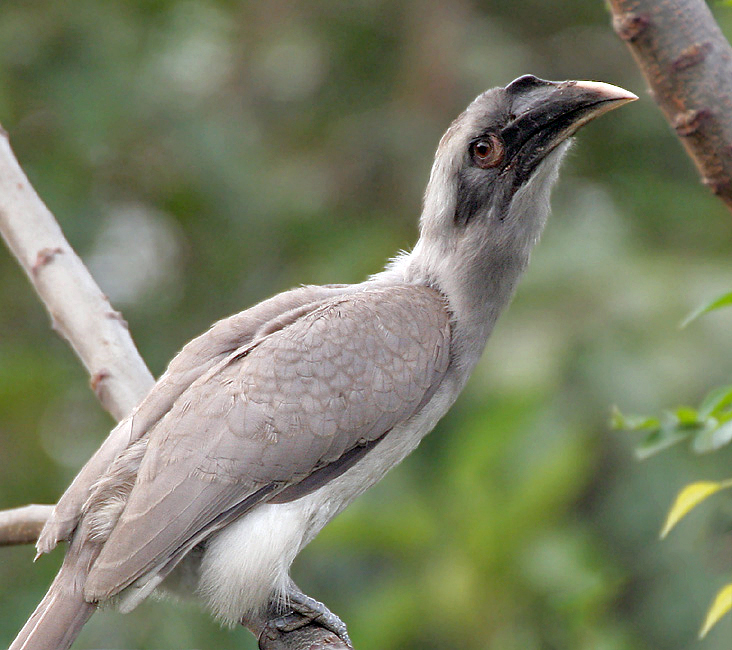
Indian grey hornbill

Order: Bucerotiformes Family: Bucerotidae

Hornbills are a group of birds whose bill is shaped like a cow's horn, but without a twist, sometimes with a casque on the upper mandible. Frequently, the bill is brightly coloured.

- Oriental pied hornbill, Anthracoceros albirostris
- Indian grey hornbill, Ocyceros birostris

== Rollers ==
Order: Coraciiformes Family: Coraciidae

Rollers resemble crows in size and build, but are more closely related to the kingfishers and bee-eaters. They share the colourful appearance of those groups with blues and browns predominating. The two inner front toes are connected, but the outer toe is not.

- Indian roller, Coracias benghalensis
- European roller, Coracias garrulus

== Kingfishers ==
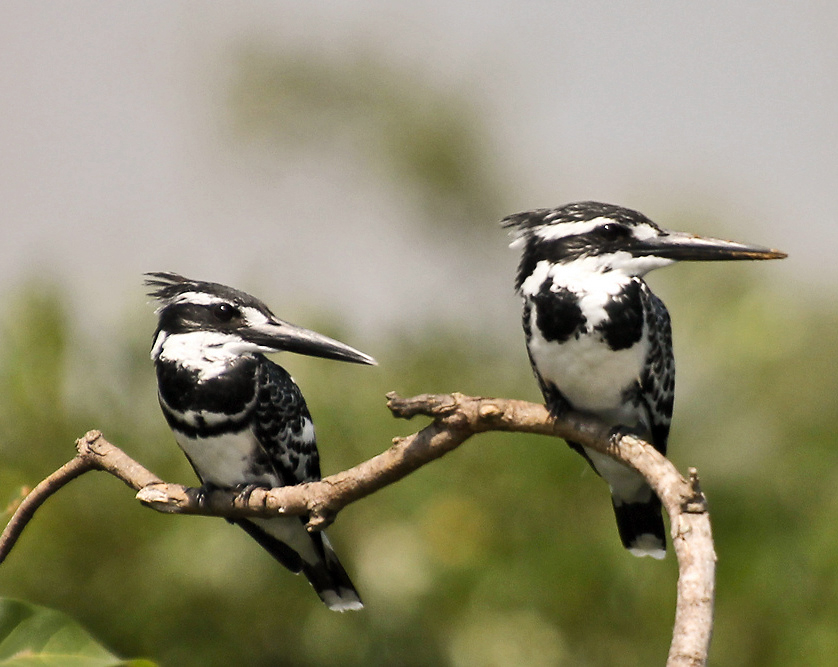
Pied kingfishers

Order: Coraciiformes Family: Alcedinidae

Kingfishers are medium-sized birds with large heads, long, pointed bills, short legs and stubby tails.

- White-throated kingfisher, Halcyon smyrnensis
- Common kingfisher, Alcedo atthis
- Pied kingfisher, Ceryle rudis

== Bee-eaters ==
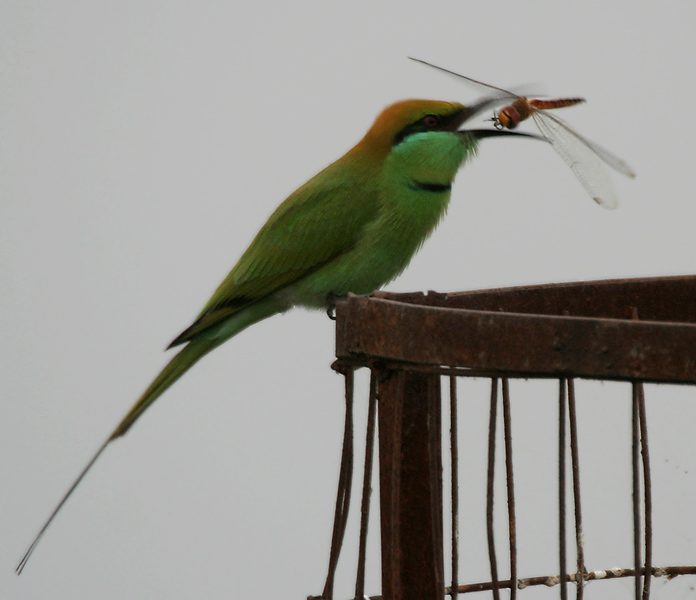
Asian green bee-eater

Order: Coraciiformes Family: Meropidae

The bee-eaters are a group of near passerine birds in the family Meropidae. Most species are found in Africa but others occur in southern Europe, Madagascar, Australia and New Guinea. They are characterised by richly coloured plumage, slender bodies and usually elongated central tail feathers. All are colourful and have long downturned bills and pointed wings, which give them a swallow-like appearance when seen from afar.

- Blue-cheeked bee-eater, Merops persicus
- Asian green bee-eater, Merops orientalis
- Blue-tailed bee-eater, Merops philippinus
- Chestnut-headed bee-eater, Merops leschenaulti (V)
- European bee-eater, Merops apiaster (V)

== Asian barbets ==
Order: Piciformes Family: Megalaimidae

The barbets are plump birds, with short necks and large heads. They get their name from the bristles which fringe their heavy bills. Most species are brightly coloured.

- Brown-headed barbet, Psilopogon zeylanicus
- Coppersmith barbet, Psilopogon haemacephalus

== Woodpeckers ==
Order: Piciformes Family: Picidae

Woodpeckers are small to medium-sized birds with chisel-like beaks, short legs, stiff tails and long tongues used for capturing insects. Some species have feet with two toes pointing forward and two backward, while several species have only three toes. Many woodpeckers have the habit of tapping noisily on tree trunks with their beaks.

- Eurasian wryneck, Jynx torquilla
- Brown-capped pygmy woodpecker, Yungipicus nanus
- Yellow-crowned woodpecker, Leiopicus mahrattensis
- Black-rumped flameback, Dinopium benghalense
- White-naped woodpecker, Chrysocolaptes festivus (V)

== Caracaras and falcons ==
Order: Falconiformes Family: Falconidae

Falconidae is a family of diurnal birds of prey. They differ from hawks, eagles, and kites in that they kill with their beaks instead of their talons.

- Lesser kestrel, Falco naumanni (V)
- Common kestrel, Falco tinnunculus
- Red-necked falcon, Falco chiquera
- Merlin, Falco columbarius
- Eurasian hobby, Falco subbuteo
- Laggar falcon, Falco jugger
- Peregrine falcon, Falco peregrinus

== Old World parrots ==
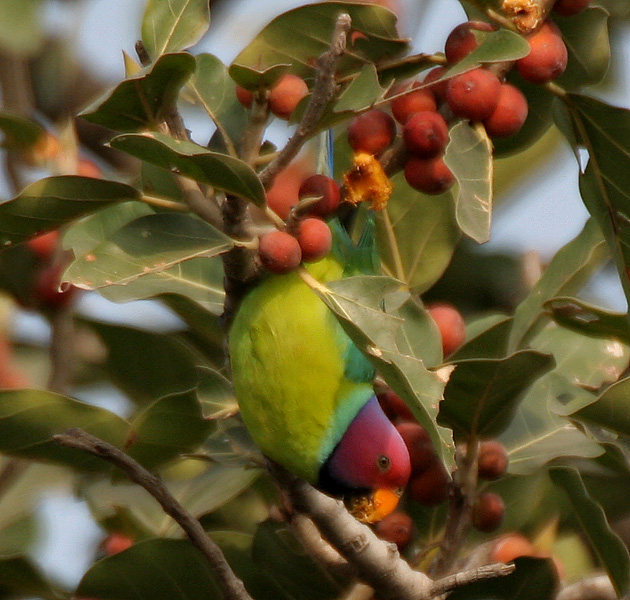
Plum-headed parakeet

Order: Psittaciformes Family: Psittaculidae

Characteristic features of parrots include a strong curved bill, an upright stance, strong legs, and clawed zygodactyl feet. Many parrots are vividly coloured, and some are multi-coloured. In size they range from 8 cm (3.1 in) to 1 m (3.3 ft) in length. Old World parrots are found from Africa east across south and southeast Asia and Oceania to Australia and New Zealand.

- Plum-headed parakeet, Psittacula cyanocephala
- Alexandrine parakeet, Psittacula eupatria
- Rose-ringed parakeet, Psittacula krameri

== Pittas ==
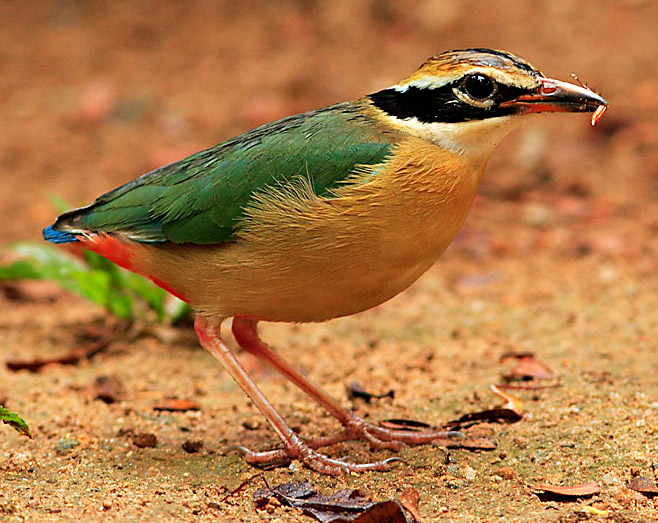
Indian pitta

Order: Passeriformes Family: Pittidae

Pittas are medium-sized by passerine standards and are stocky, with fairly long, strong legs, short tails and stout bills. Many are brightly coloured. They spend the majority of their time on wet forest floors, eating snails, insects and similar invertebrates.

- Indian pitta, Pitta brachyura
- Western hooded pitta, Pitta sordida (V)

== Vangas, helmetshrikes, woodshrikes, and shrike-flycatchers ==
Order: Passeriformes Family: Vangidae

The woodshrikes are similar in build to the shrikes.

- Common woodshrike, Tephrodornis pondicerianus

== Ioras ==
Order: Passeriformes Family: Aegithinidae

The ioras are bulbul-like birds of open forest or thorn scrub, but whereas that group tends to be drab in colouration, ioras are sexually dimorphic, with the males being brightly plumaged in yellows and greens.

- Marshall's iora, Aegithina nigrolutea

== Cuckooshrikes ==
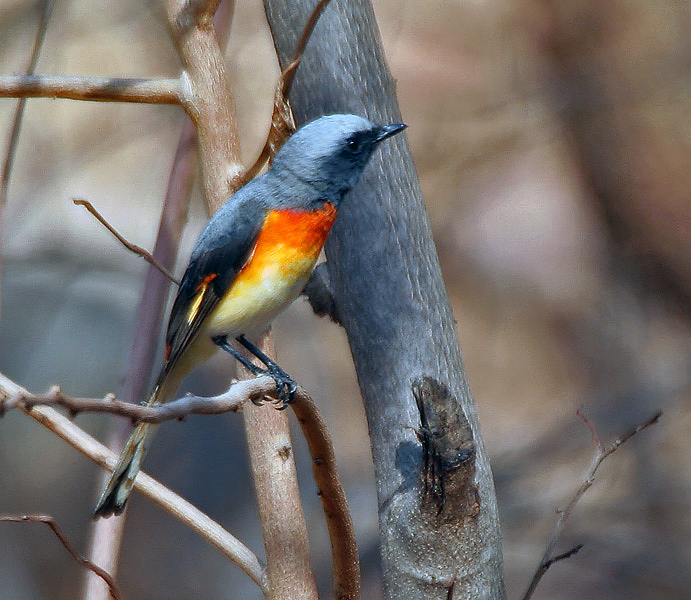
Small minivet

Order: Passeriformes Family: Campephagidae

The cuckooshrikes are small to medium-sized passerine birds. They are predominantly greyish with white and black, although some species are brightly coloured.

- White-bellied minivet, Pericrocotus erythropygius
- Small minivet, Pericrocotus cinnamomeus
- Long-tailed minivet, Pericrocotus ethologus
- Large cuckooshrike, Coracina macei
- Black-winged cuckooshrike, Lalage melaschistos (V)
- Black-headed cuckooshrike, Lalage melanoptera

== Shrikes ==
Order: Passeriformes Family: Laniidae Shrikes are passerine birds known for their habit of catching other birds and small animals and impaling the uneaten portions of their bodies on thorns. A typical shrike's beak is hooked, like a bird of prey.

- Brown shrike, Lanius cristatus
- Isabelline shrike, Lanius isabellinus
- Bay-backed shrike, Lanius vittatus
- Long-tailed shrike, Lanius schach
- Red-tailed shrike, Lanius phoenicuroides
- Great grey shrike, Lanius excubitor

== Figbirds, orioles, and turnagra ==
Order: Passeriformes Family: Oriolidae

The Old World orioles are colourful passerine birds. They are not related to the New World orioles.

- Black-hooded oriole, Oriolus xanthornus
- Indian golden oriole, Oriolus kundoo

== Drongos ==
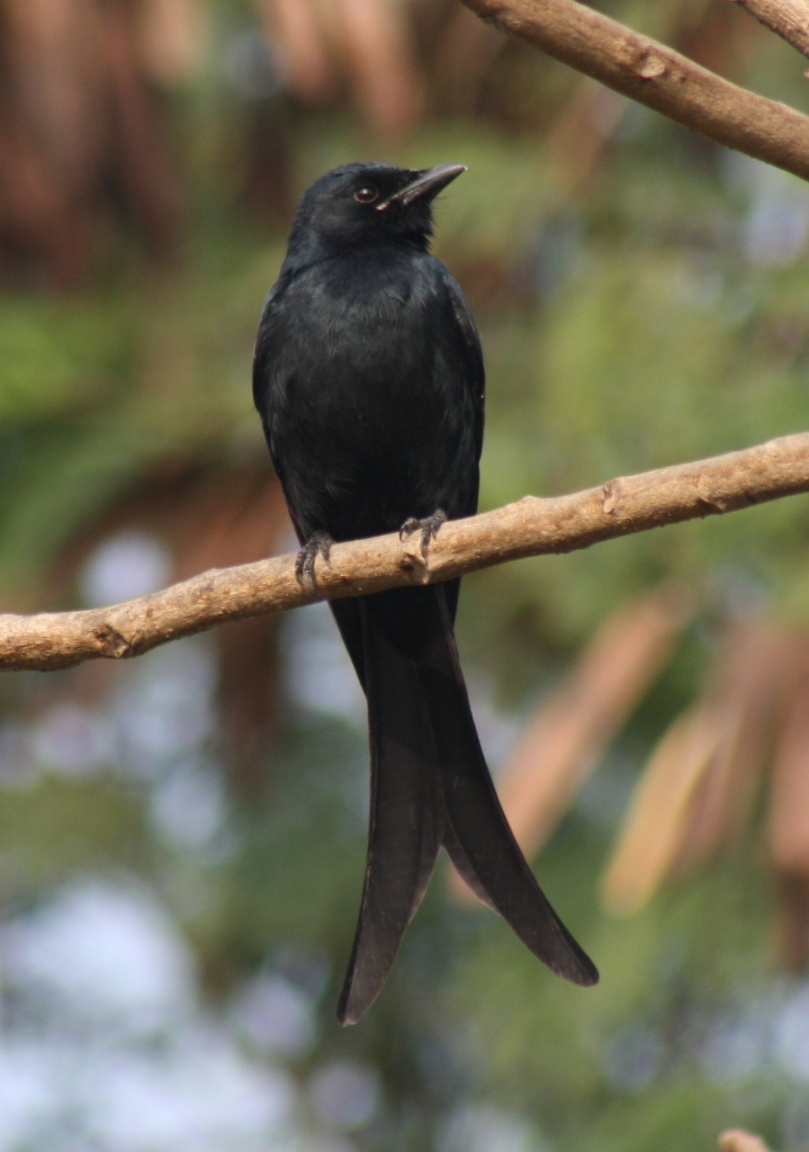
Black drongo

Order: Passeriformes Family: Dicruridae

The drongos are mostly black or dark grey in colour, sometimes with metallic tints. They have long forked tails, and some Asian species have elaborate tail decorations. They have short legs and sit very upright when perched, like a shrike. They flycatch or take prey from the ground.

- Greater racket-tailed drongo, Dicrurus paradiseus (V)
- Hair-crested drongo, Dicrurus hottentottus (V)
- Ashy drongo, Dicrurus leucophaeus
- White-bellied drongo, Dicrurus caerulescens
- Black drongo, Dicrurus macrocercus

== Fantails and silktails ==
Order: Passeriformes Family: Rhipiduridae

The fantails are small insectivorous birds which are specialist aerial feeders.

- White-browed fantail, Rhipidura aureola

== Monarchs ==
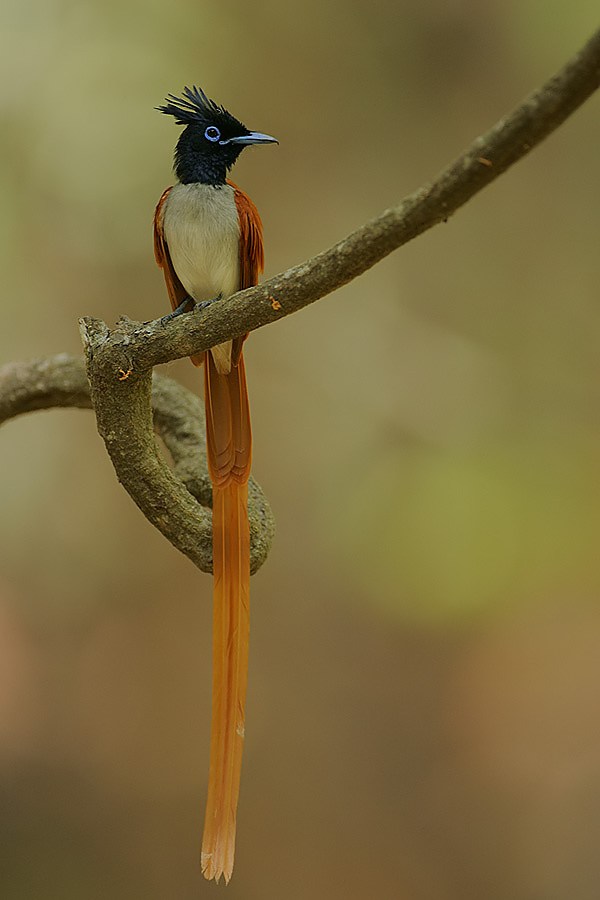
Indian paradise flycatcher

Order: Passeriformes Family: Monarchidae

The monarch flycatchers are small to medium-sized insectivorous passerines which hunt by flycatching.

- Black-naped monarch, Hypothymis azurea
- Indian paradise flycatcher, Terpsiphone paradisi

== Crows and jays ==
Order: Passeriformes Family: Corvidae

The family Corvidae includes crows, ravens, jays, choughs, magpies, treepies, nutcrackers and ground jays. Corvids are above average in size among the Passeriformes, and some of the larger species show high levels of intelligence.

- Rufous treepie, Dendrocitta vagabunda
- Common raven, Corvus corax (V)
- House crow, Corvus splendens
- Indian jungle crow, Corvus culminatus

== Fairy flycatchers ==
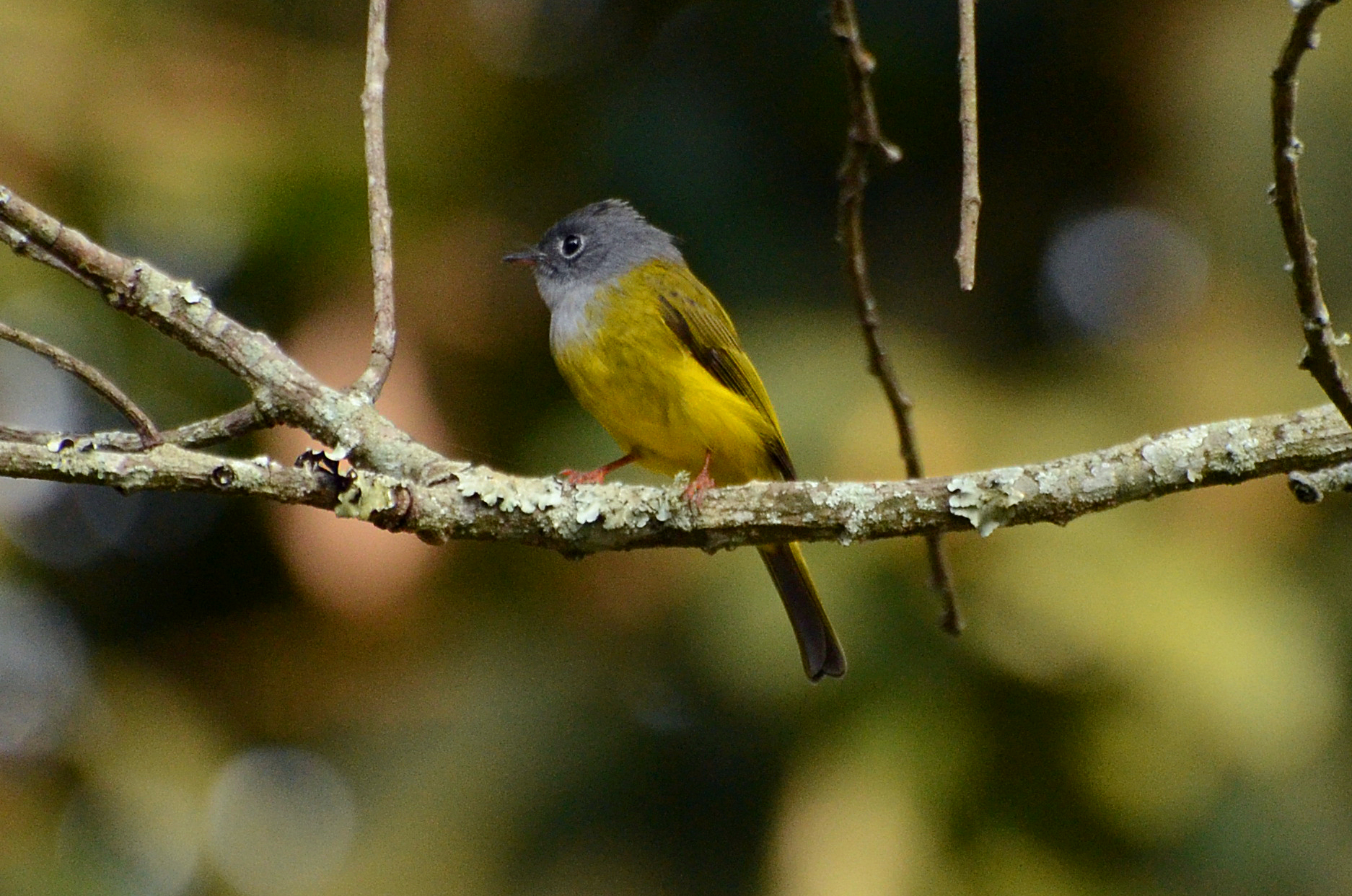
Grey-headed canary-flycatcher

Order: Passeriformes Family: Stenostiridae

Most of the species of this small family are found in Africa, though a few inhabit tropical Asia. They are not closely related to other birds called "flycatchers".

- Grey-headed canary-flycatcher, Culicicapa ceylonensis

== Tits and chickadees ==
Order: Passeriformes Family: Paridae

The Paridae are mainly small stocky woodland species with short stout bills. Some have crests. They are adaptable birds, with a mixed diet including seeds and insects.

- Cinereous tit, Parus cinereus
- White-naped tit, Machlolophus nuchalis
- Fire-capped tit, Cephalopyrus flammiceps

== Penduline tits ==
Order: Passeriformes Family: Remizidae

The penduline tits are a group of small passerine birds related to the true tits. They are insectivores.

- White-crowned penduline-tit, Remiz coronatus

== Larks ==
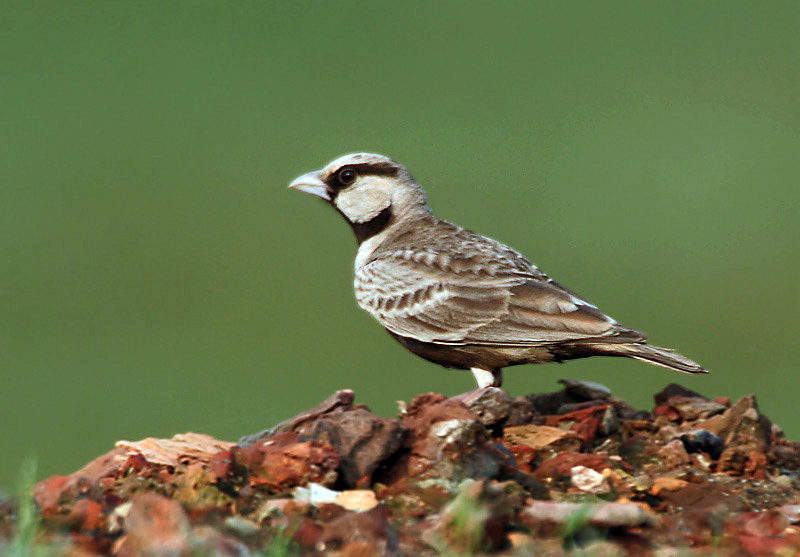
Ashy-crowned sparrow-lark

Order: Passeriformes Family: Alaudidae

Larks are small terrestrial birds with often extravagant songs and display flights. Most larks are fairly dull in appearance. Their food is insects and seeds.

- Rufous-tailed lark, Ammomanes phoenicura
- Ashy-crowned sparrow-lark, Eremopterix griseus
- Singing bush lark, Mirafra cantillans
- Bengal bushlark, Plocealauda assamica
- Indian bush lark, Mirafra erythroptera
- Oriental skylark, Alauda gulgula
- Eurasian skylark, Alauda arvensis
- Crested lark, Galerida cristata
- Greater short-toed lark, Calandrella brachydactyla
- Mongolian short-toed lark, Calandrella dukhunensis
- Hume's short-toed lark, Calandrella acutirostris
- Bimaculated lark, Melanocorypha bimaculata
- Turkestan short-toed lark, Alaudala heinei (V)
- Sand lark, Alaudala raytal
- Horned lark, Eremophila alpestris (V)

== Bulbuls ==
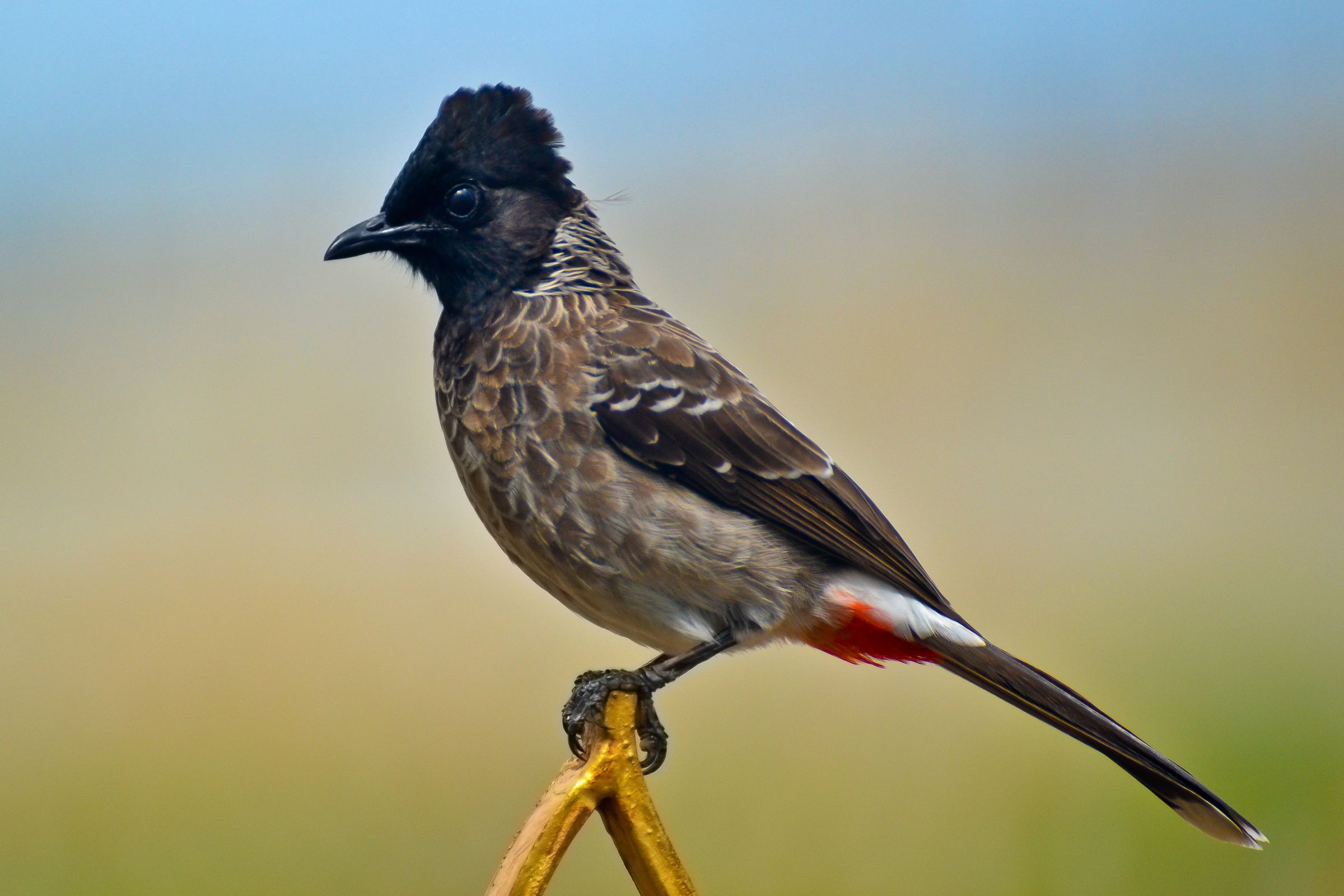
Red-vented bulbul

Order: Passeriformes Family: Pycnonotidae

Bulbuls are medium-sized songbirds. Some are colourful with yellow, red or orange vents, cheeks, throats or supercilia, but most are drab, with uniform olive-brown to black plumage. Some species have distinct crests.

- White-eared bulbul, Pycnonotus leucotis
- Himalayan bulbul, Pycnonotus leucogenys (V)
- Red-whiskered bulbul, Pycnonotus jocosus
- Red-vented bulbul, Pycnonotus cafer

== Swallows and martins ==
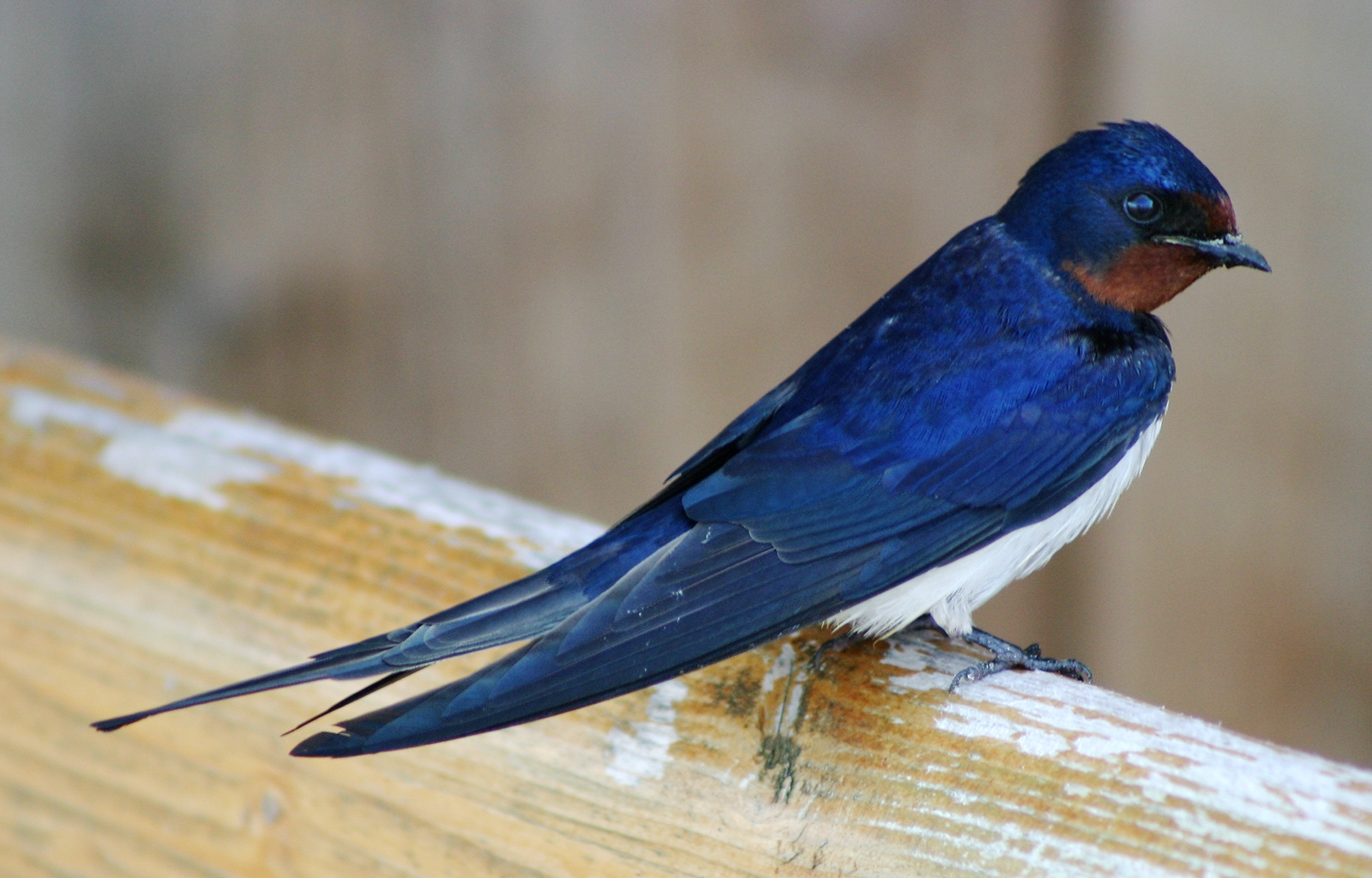
Barn swallow

Order: Passeriformes Family: Hirundinidae

The family Hirundinidae is adapted to aerial feeding. They have a slender streamlined body, long pointed wings and a short bill with a wide gape. The feet are adapted to perching rather than walking, and the front toes are partially joined at the base.

- Grey-throated martin, Riparia chinensis
- Sand martin, Riparia riparia (V)
- Pale martin, Riparia diluta
- Barn swallow, Hirundo rustica
- Wire-tailed swallow, Hirundo smithii
- Dusky crag martin, Ptyonoprogne concolor
- Common house martin, Delichon urbicum (V)
- Eastern red-rumped swallow, Cecropis daurica
- Streak-throated swallow, Petrochelidon fluvicola

== Leaf warblers and allies ==
Order: Passeriformes Family: Phylloscopidae

Leaf warblers are a family of small insectivorous birds found mostly in Eurasia and ranging into Wallacea and Africa. The species are of various sizes, often green-plumaged above and yellow below, or more subdued with greyish-green to greyish-brown colours.

- Hume's leaf warbler, Phylloscopus humei
- Brooks's leaf warbler, Phylloscopus subvirdis
- Tytler's leaf warbler, Phylloscopus tytleri
- Lemon-rumped warbler, Phylloscopus chloronotus (V)
- Sulphur-bellied warbler, Phylloscopus griseolus
- Tickell's leaf warbler, Phylloscopus affinis
- Smoky warbler, Phylloscopus fuligiventer
- Mountain chiffchaff, Phylloscopus sindianus (V)
- Common chiffchaff, Phylloscopus collybita
- Green-crowned warbler, Phylloscopus burkii(V)
- Whistler's warbler, Phylloscopus whistleri (V)
- Green warbler, Phylloscopus nitidus
- Greenish warbler, Phylloscopus trochiloides
- Large-billed leaf warbler, Phylloscopus magnirostris
- Western crowned warbler, Phylloscopus occipitalis
- Grey-hooded warbler, Phylloscopus xanthoschistos (V)

== Reed warblers, Grauer's warbler, and allies ==
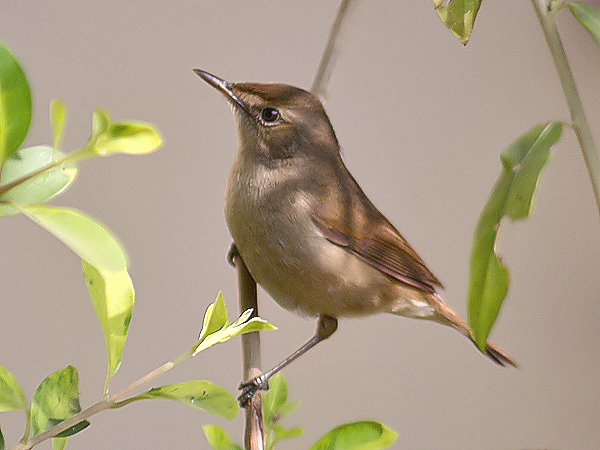
Blyth's reed warbler

Order: Passeriformes Family: Acrocephalidae

The members of this family are usually rather large for "warblers". Most are rather plain olivaceous brown above with much yellow to beige below. They are usually found in open woodland, reedbeds, or tall grass. The family occurs mostly in southern to western Eurasia and surroundings, but it also ranges far into the Pacific, with some species in Africa.

- Clamorous reed warbler, Acrocephalus stentoreus
- Paddyfield warbler, Acrocephalus agricola
- Blyth's reed warbler, Acrocephalus dumetorum
- Moustached warbler, Acrocephalus melanopogon
- Booted warbler, Iduna caligata
- Sykes's warbler, Iduna rama

== Grassbirds and allies ==
Order: Passeriformes Family: Locustellidae

Locustellidae are a family of small insectivorous songbirds found mainly in Eurasia, Africa, and the Australian region. They are smallish birds with tails that are usually long and pointed, and tend to be drab brownish or buffy all over.

- Striated grassbird, Megalurus palustris
- Common grasshopper warbler, Locustella naevia
- Bristled grassbird, Schoenicola striatus

== Cisticolas and allies ==
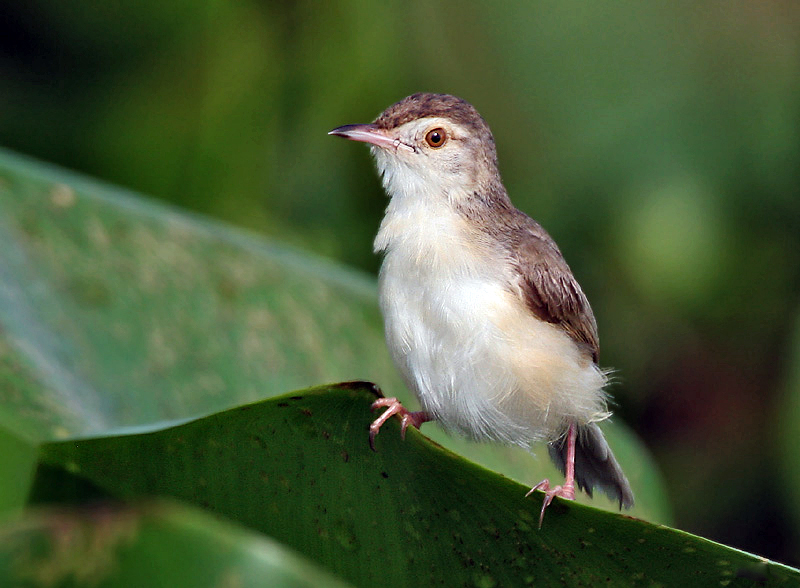
Plain prinia

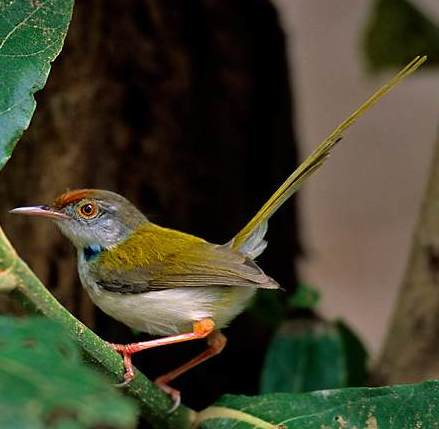
Common tailorbird

Order: Passeriformes Family: Cisticolidae

The Cisticolidae are warblers found mainly in warmer southern regions of the Old World. They are generally very small birds of drab brown or grey appearance found in open country such as grassland or scrub.

- Zitting cisticola, Cisticola juncidis
- Rufous-fronted prinia, Prinia buchanani
- Delicate prinia, Prinia lepida
- Grey-breasted prinia, Prinia hodgsonii
- Jungle prinia, Prinia sylvatica
- Ashy prinia, Prinia socialis
- Plain prinia, Prinia inornata
- Yellow-bellied prinia, Prinia flaviventris
- Common tailorbird, Orthotomus sutorius

== Cettia bush warblers and allies ==
Order: Passeriformes Family: Cettiidae

Cettiidae is a family of small insectivorous songbirds. It contains the typical bush warblers (Cettia) and their relatives. Its members occur mainly in Asia and Africa, ranging into Oceania and Europe.

- Cetti's warbler, Cettia cetti

== Sylviid babblers ==
Order: Passeriformes Family: Sylviidae

The family Sylviidae is a group of small insectivorous passerine birds. They mainly occur as breeding species, as the common name implies, in Europe, Asia and, to a lesser extent, Africa. Most are of generally undistinguished appearance, but many have distinctive songs.

- Lesser whitethroat, Curruca curruca
- Common whitethroat, Curruca communis (V)
- Eastern Orphean warbler, Curruca crassirostris
- Asian desert warbler, Curruca nana (V)

== Parrotbills and allies ==
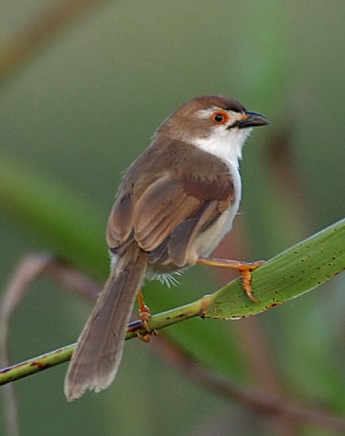
Yellow-eyed babbler

Order: Passeriformes Family: Paradoxornithidae

The parrotbills are a group of peculiar birds native to East and Southeast Asia, though feral populations exist elsewhere. They are generally small, long-tailed birds which inhabit reedbeds and similar habitat. They feed mainly on seeds, e.g. of grasses, to which their bill, as the name implies, is well-adapted.

- Yellow-eyed babbler, Chrysomma sinense

== White-eyes ==
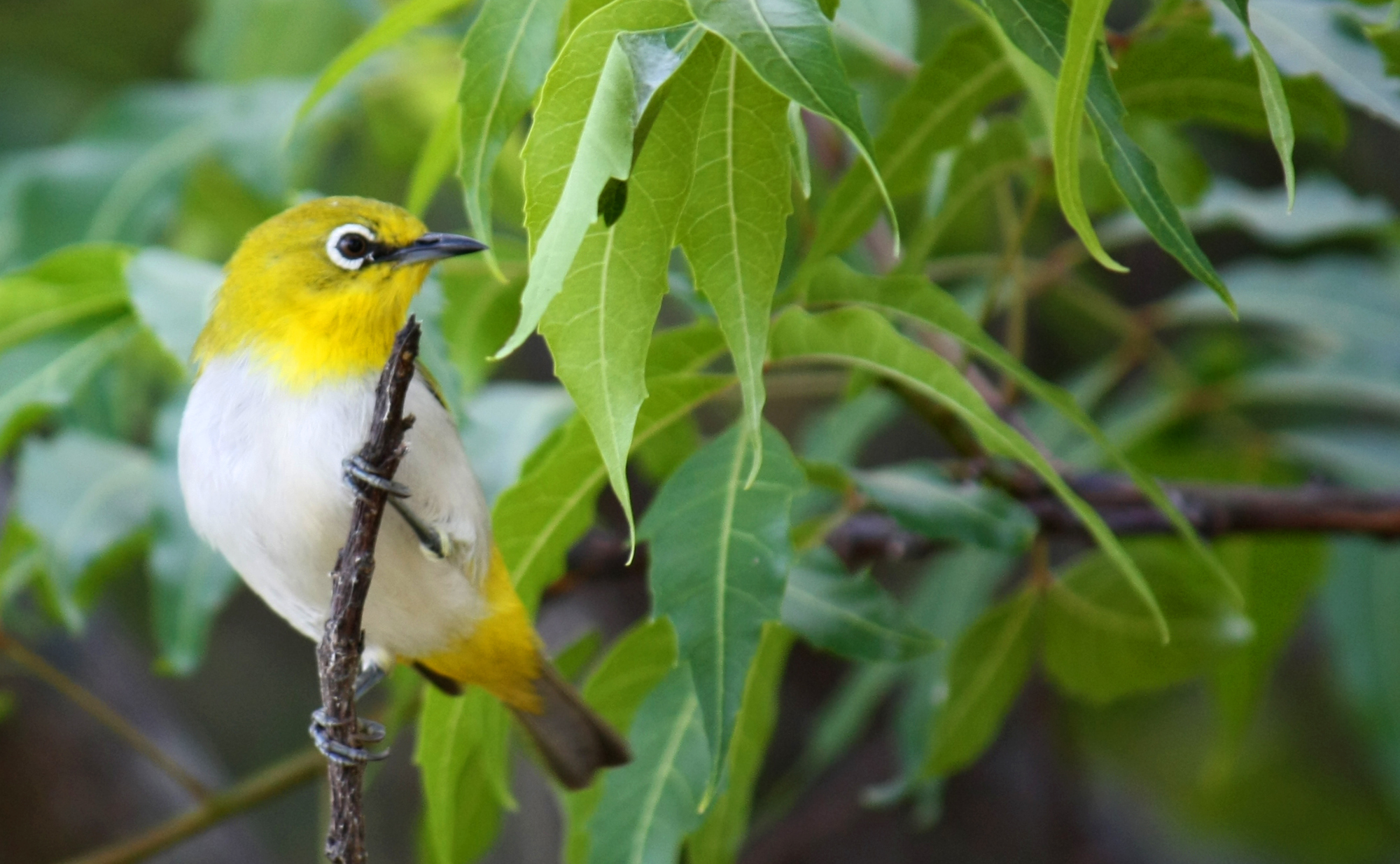
Indian white-eye

Order: Passeriformes Family: Zosteropidae

The white-eyes are small and mostly undistinguished, their plumage above being generally some dull colour like greenish-olive, but some species have a white or bright yellow throat, breast or lower parts, and several have buff flanks. As their name suggests, many species have a white ring around each eye.

- Indian white-eye, Zosterops palpebrosus

== Laughingthrushes and allies ==
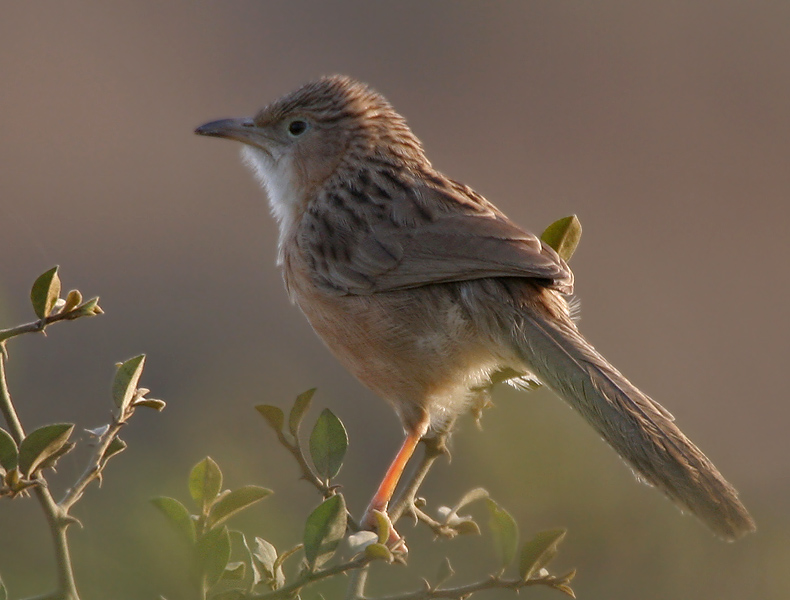
Common babbler

Order: Passeriformes Family: Leiothrichidae

The members of this family are diverse in size and colouration, though those of genus Turdoides tend to be brown or greyish. The family is found in Africa, India, and southeast Asia.

- Large grey babbler, Argya malcolmi
- Jungle babbler, Argya striata
- Yellow-billed babbler, Argya affinis
- Common babbler, Argya caudata

== Nuthatches ==
Order: Passeriformes Family: Sittidae

Nuthatches are small woodland birds. They have the unusual ability to climb down trees head first, unlike other birds which can only go upwards. Nuthatches have big heads, short tails and powerful bills and feet.

- Indian nuthatch, Sitta castanea

== Wallcreeper ==
Order: Passeriformes Family: Tichodromidae

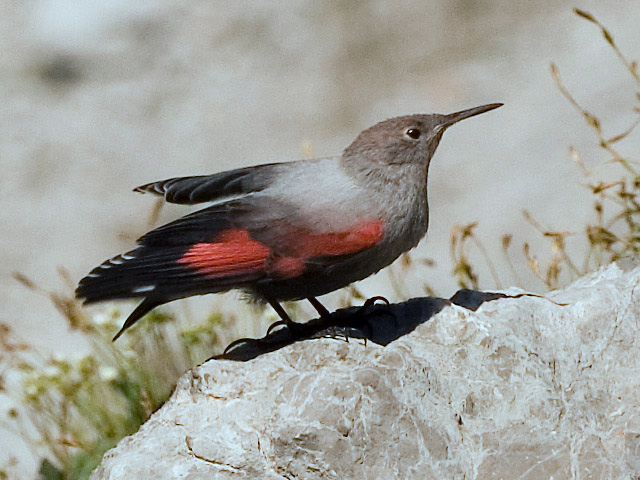
Wallcreeper

The wallcreeper is a small bird related to the nuthatch family, which has stunning crimson, grey and black plumage.

- Wallcreeper, Tichodroma muraria

== Treecreepers ==
Order: Passeriformes Family: Certhiidae

Treecreepers are small woodland birds, brown above and white below. They have thin pointed down-curved bills, which they use to extricate insects from bark. They have stiff tail feathers, like woodpeckers, which they use to support themselves on vertical trees.

- Indian spotted creeper, Salpornis spilonota

== Starlings and rhabdornis ==
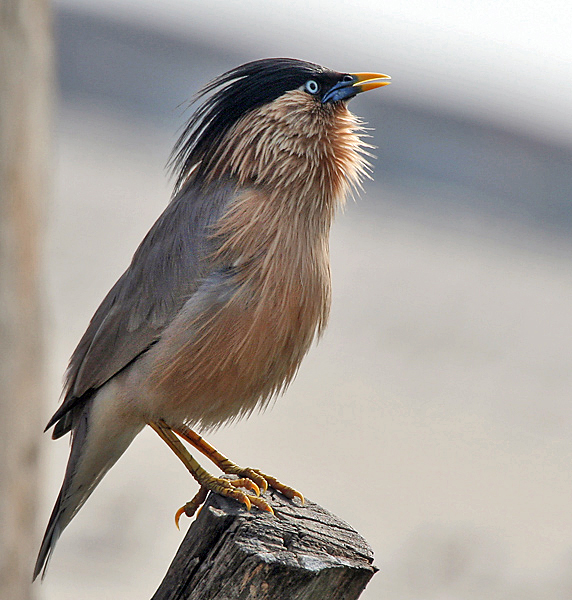
Brahminy starling

Order: Passeriformes Family: Sturnidae

Starlings are small to medium-sized passerine birds. Their flight is strong and direct and they are very gregarious. Their preferred habitat is fairly open country. They eat insects and fruit. Plumage is typically dark with a metallic sheen.

- Jungle myna, Acridotheres fuscus
- Bank myna, Acridotheres ginginianus
- Common myna, Acridotheres tristis
- Indian pied myna, Gracupica contra
- Chestnut-tailed starling, Sturnia malabarica
- Brahminy starling, Sturnia pagodarum
- Rosy starling, Pastor roseus
- Common starling, Sturnus vulgaris

== Thrushes and allies ==
Order: Passeriformes Family: Turdidae

The thrushes are a group of passerine birds that occur mainly in the Old World. They are plump, soft plumaged, small to medium-sized insectivores or sometimes omnivores, often feeding on the ground. Many have attractive songs.

- Orange-headed thrush, Geokichla citrina
- Tickell's thrush, Turdus unicolor
- Grey-winged blackbird, Turdus boulboul
- Black-throated thrush, Turdus atrogularis
- Mistle thrush, Turdus viscivorus (V)
- Song thrush, Turdus philomelos (V)
- Scaly thrush, Zoothera dauma

== Old World flycatchers ==
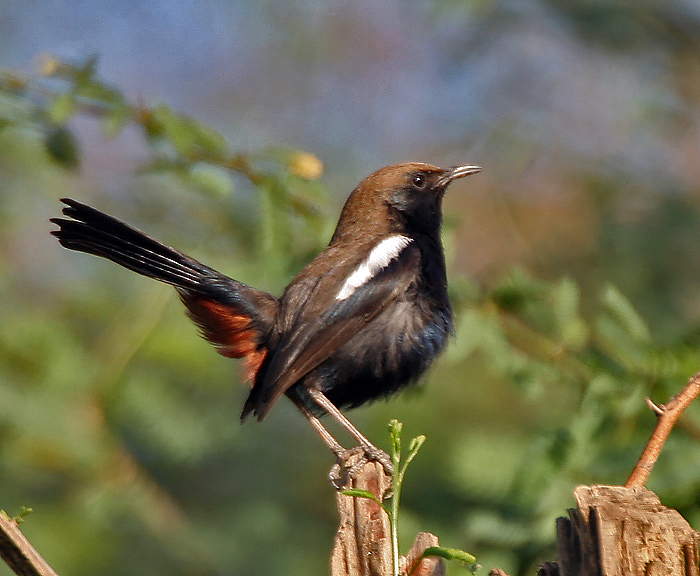
Indian robin

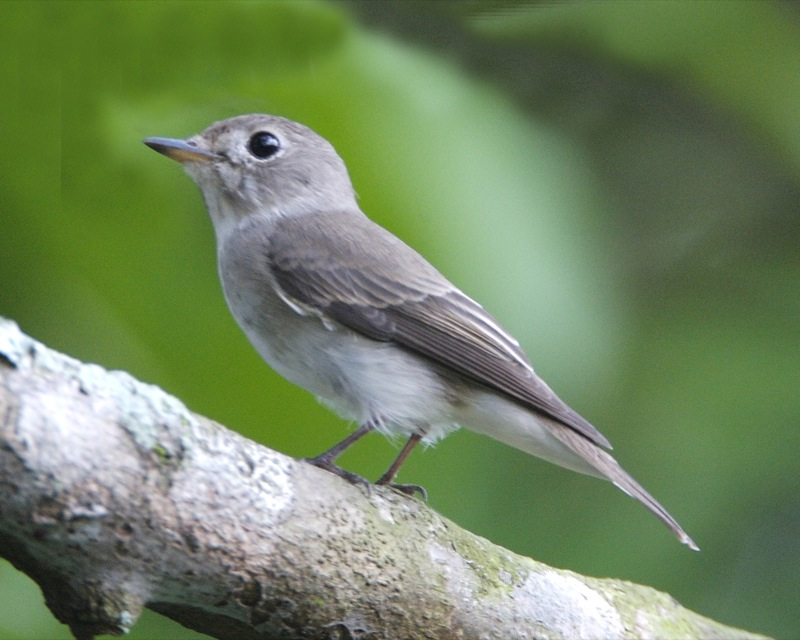
Asian brown flycatcher

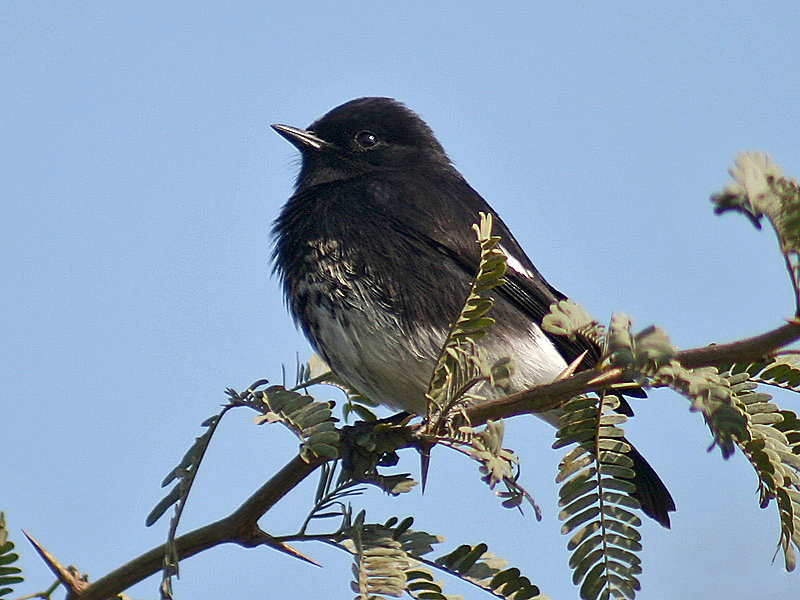
Pied bushchat

Order: Passeriformes Family: Muscicapidae

Old World flycatchers are a large group of small passerine birds native to the Old World. They are mainly small arboreal insectivores. The appearance of these birds is highly varied, but they mostly have weak songs and harsh calls.

- Indian robin, Copsychus fulicatus
- Oriental magpie-robin, Copsychus saularis
- Asian brown flycatcher, Muscicapa dauurica
- Brown-breasted flycatcher, Muscicapa muttui (V)
- Spotted flycatcher, Muscicapa striata (V)
- Rufous-tailed scrub robin, Cercotrichas galactotes (V)
- Tickell's blue flycatcher, Cyornis tickelliae
- Blue-throated blue flycatcher, Cyornis rubeculoides (V)
- Verditer flycatcher, Eumyias thalassinus
- Himalayan bluetail, Tarsiger rufilatus (V)
- Indian blue robin, Larvivora brunnea (V)
- Bluethroat, Luscinia svecica
- Siberian rubythroat, Calliope calliope (V)
- Malabar whistling thrush, Myophonus caeruleus (V)
- Ultramarine flycatcher, Ficedula superciliaris
- Rusty-tailed flycatcher, Ficedula ruficauda
- Taiga flycatcher, Ficedula albicilla
- Red-breasted flycatcher, Ficedula parva
- Kashmir flycatcher, Ficedula subrubra (V)
- Black redstart, Phoenicurus ochruros
- Plumbeous water redstart, Phoenicurus fuliginosus (V)
- White-capped redstart, Phoenicurus leucocephalus (V)
- Blue-capped redstart, Phoenicurus coeruleocephala (V)
- Blue rock thrush, Monticola solitarius
- Blue-capped rock thrush, Monticola cinclorhyncha
- Common rock thrush, Monticola saxatilis (V)
- Siberian stonechat, Saxicola maurus
- White-tailed stonechat, Saxicola leucurus
- Pied bush chat, Saxicola caprata
- White-browed bush chat, Saxicola macrorhynchus
- Grey bush chat, Saxicola ferreus
- Isabelline wheatear, Oenanthe isabellina
- Desert wheatear, Oenanthe deserti
- Brown rock chat, Oenanthe fusca
- Variable wheatear, Oenanthe picata
- Red-tailed wheatear, Oenanthe chrysopygia

== Flowerpeckers ==
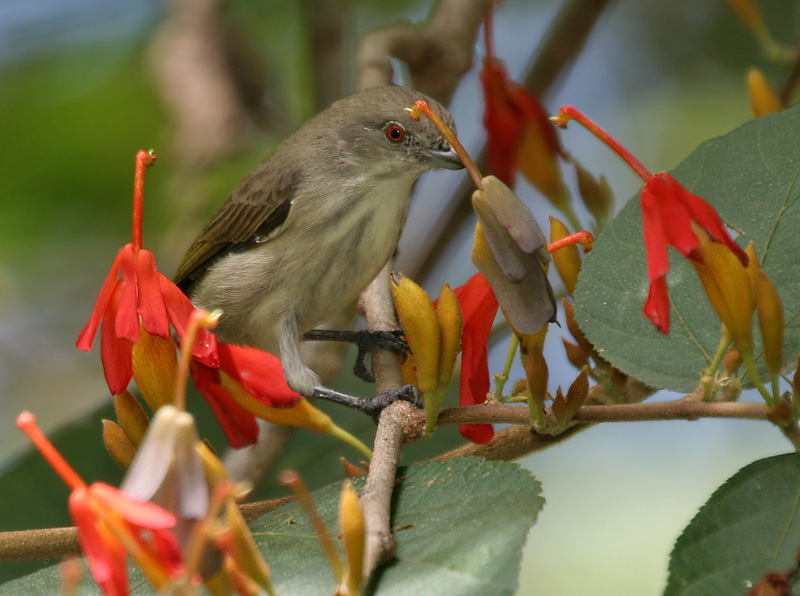
Thick-billed flowerpecker

Order: Passeriformes Family: Dicaeidae The flowerpeckers are very small, stout, often brightly coloured birds, with short tails, short thick curved bills and tubular tongues.

- Thick-billed flowerpecker, Dicaeum agile

== Sunbirds ==
Order: Passeriformes Family: Nectariniidae

The sunbirds and spiderhunters are very small passerine birds which feed largely on nectar, although they will also take insects, especially when feeding young. Flight is fast and direct on their short wings. Most species can take nectar by hovering like a hummingbird, but usually perch to feed.

- Purple sunbird, Cinnyris asiaticus

== Old World sparrows and snowfinches ==
Order: Passeriformes Family: Passeridae

Sparrows are small passerine birds. In general, sparrows tend to be small, plump, brown or grey birds with short tails and short powerful beaks. Sparrows are seed eaters, but they also consume small insects.

- House sparrow, Passer domesticus
- Spanish sparrow, Passer hispaniolensis
- Sind sparrow, Passer pyrrhonotus
- Yellow-throated sparrow, Gymnoris xanthocollis

== Weavers and widowbirds ==
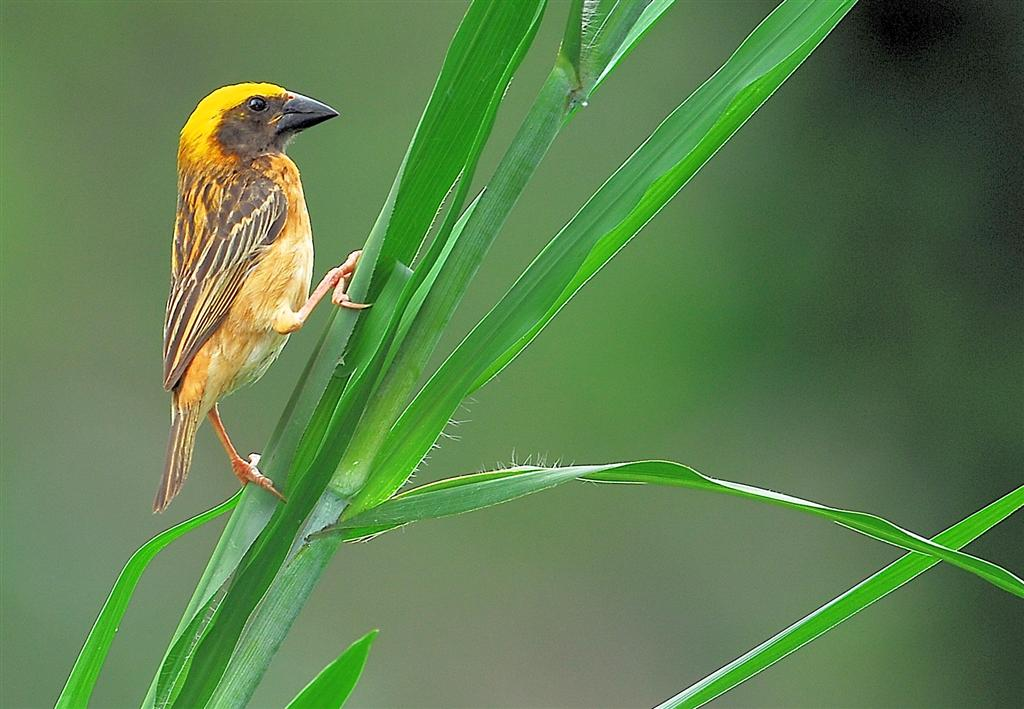
Baya weaver

Order: Passeriformes Family: Ploceidae

The weavers are small passerine birds related to the finches. They are seed-eating birds with rounded conical bills. The males of many species are brightly coloured, usually in red or yellow and black, some species show variation in colour only in the breeding season.

- Black-breasted weaver, Ploceus benghalensis
- Streaked weaver, Ploceus manyar
- Baya weaver, Ploceus philippinus
- Finn's weaver, Ploceus megarhynchus (V)

== Waxbills, munias, and allies ==
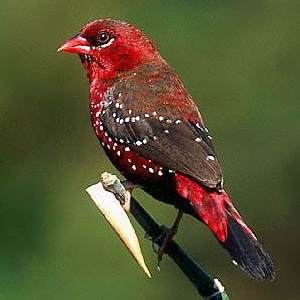
Red avadavat

Order: Passeriformes Family: Estrildidae

The estrildid finches are small passerine birds of the Old World tropics and Australasia. They are gregarious and often colonial seed eaters with short thick but pointed bills. They are all similar in structure and habits, but have wide variation in plumage colours and patterns.

- Indian silverbill, Euodice malabarica
- Scaly-breasted munia, Lonchura punctulata
- Chestnut munia, Lonchura atricapilla (V)
- Tricoloured munia, Lonchura malacca
- Green avadavat, Green avadavat(V)
- Red avadavat, Amandava amandava

== Wagtails and pipits ==
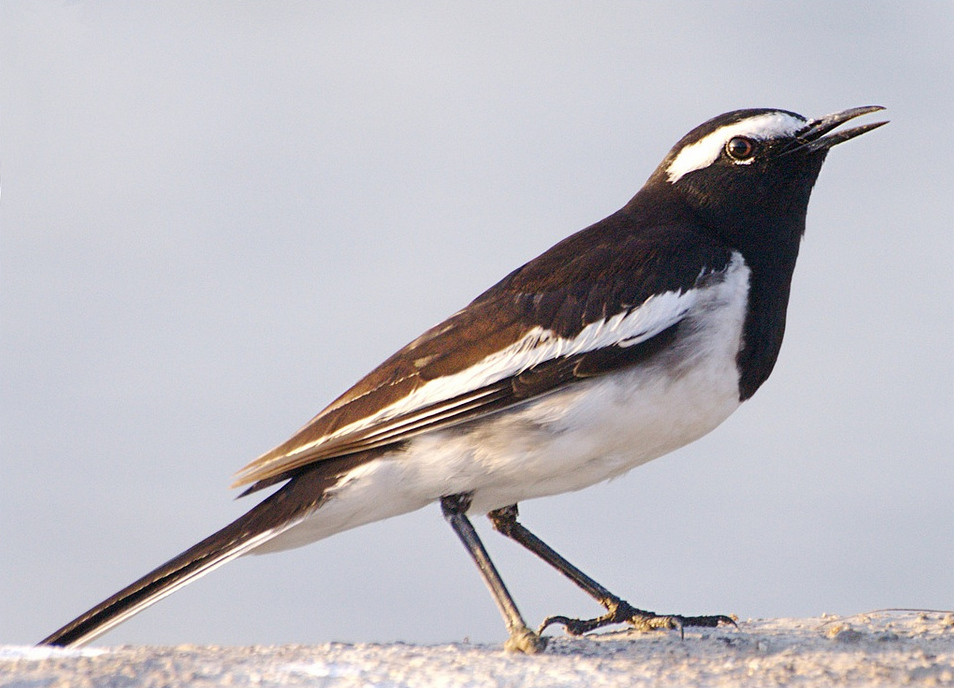
White-browed wagtail

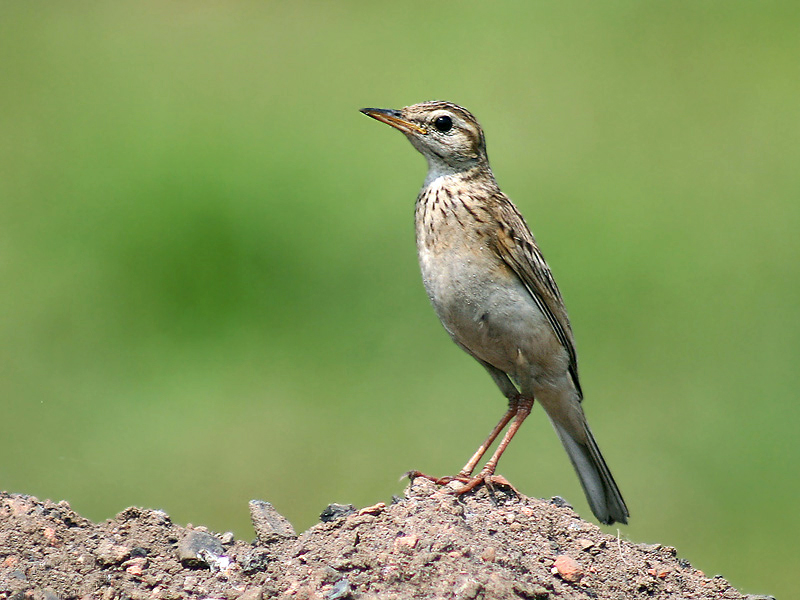
Paddyfield pipit

Order: Passeriformes Family: Motacillidae

Motacillidae is a family of small passerine birds with medium to long tails. They include the wagtails, longclaws and pipits. They are slender, ground feeding insectivores of open country.

- Forest wagtail, Dendronanthus indicus (V)
- Western yellow wagtail, Motacilla flava
- Citrine wagtail, Motacilla citreola
- Grey wagtail, Motacilla cinerea
- White wagtail, Motacilla alba
- White-browed wagtail, Motacilla maderaspatensis
- Richard's pipit, Anthus richardi
- Paddyfield pipit, Anthus rufulus
- Blyth's pipit, Anthus godlewskii
- Tawny pipit, Anthus campestris
- Long-billed pipit, Anthus similis
- Tree pipit, Anthus trivialis
- Olive-backed pipit, Anthus hodgsoni
- Red-throated pipit, Anthus cervinus (V)
- Rosy pipit, Anthus roseatus
- Water pipit, Anthus spinoletta

== Finches and euphonias ==
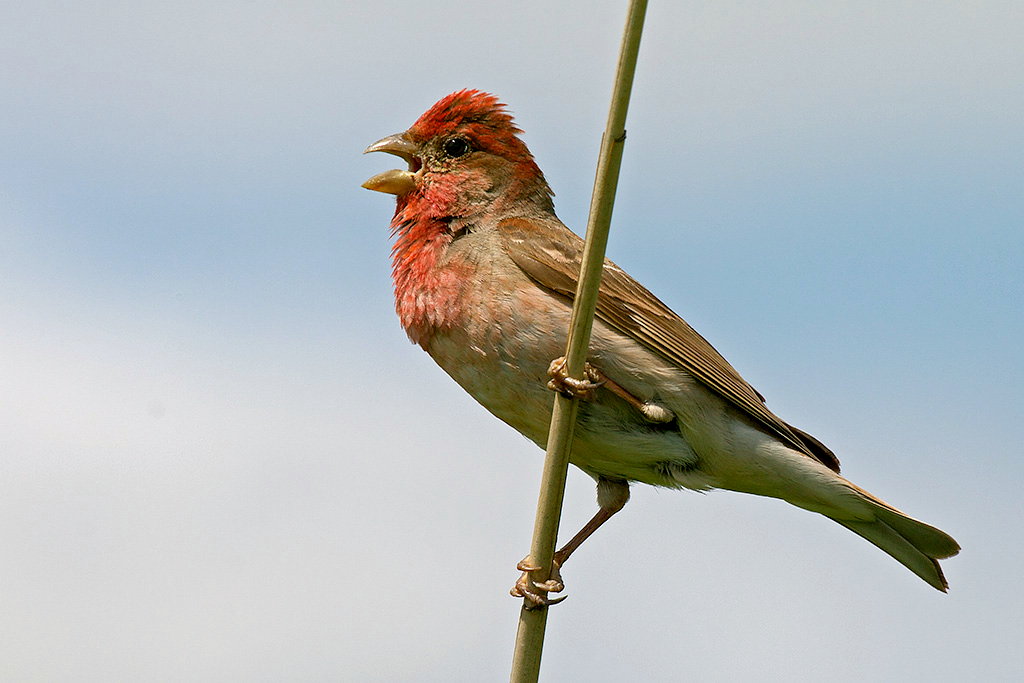
Common rosefinch

Order: Passeriformes Family: Fringillidae

Finches are seed-eating passerine birds, that are small to moderately large and have a strong beak, usually conical and in some species very large. All have twelve tail feathers and nine primaries. These birds have a bouncing flight with alternating bouts of flapping and gliding on closed wings, and most sing well.

- Common rosefinch, Carpodacus erythrinus
- Brambling, Fringilla montifringilla (V)

== Buntings ==
Order: Passeriformes Family: Emberizidae

The emberizids are a large family of passerine birds. They are seed-eating birds with distinctively shaped bills. In Europe, most species are called buntings. In North America, most of the species in this family are known as sparrows, but these birds are not closely related to the Old World sparrows which are in the family Passeridae. Many emberizid species have distinctive head patterns.

- Crested bunting, Emberiza lathami
- Grey-necked bunting, Emberiza buchanani
- Black-headed bunting, Emberiza melanocephala
- Red-headed bunting, Emberiza bruniceps
- Chestnut-eared bunting, Emberiza fucata (V)
- Rock bunting, Emberiza cia (V)
- White-capped bunting, Emberiza stewarti
- Ortolan bunting, Emberiza hortulana (V)
- Striolated bunting, Emberiza striolata (V)
- Common reed bunting, Emberiza schoeniclus (V)

== See also ==
- Lists of birds by region
