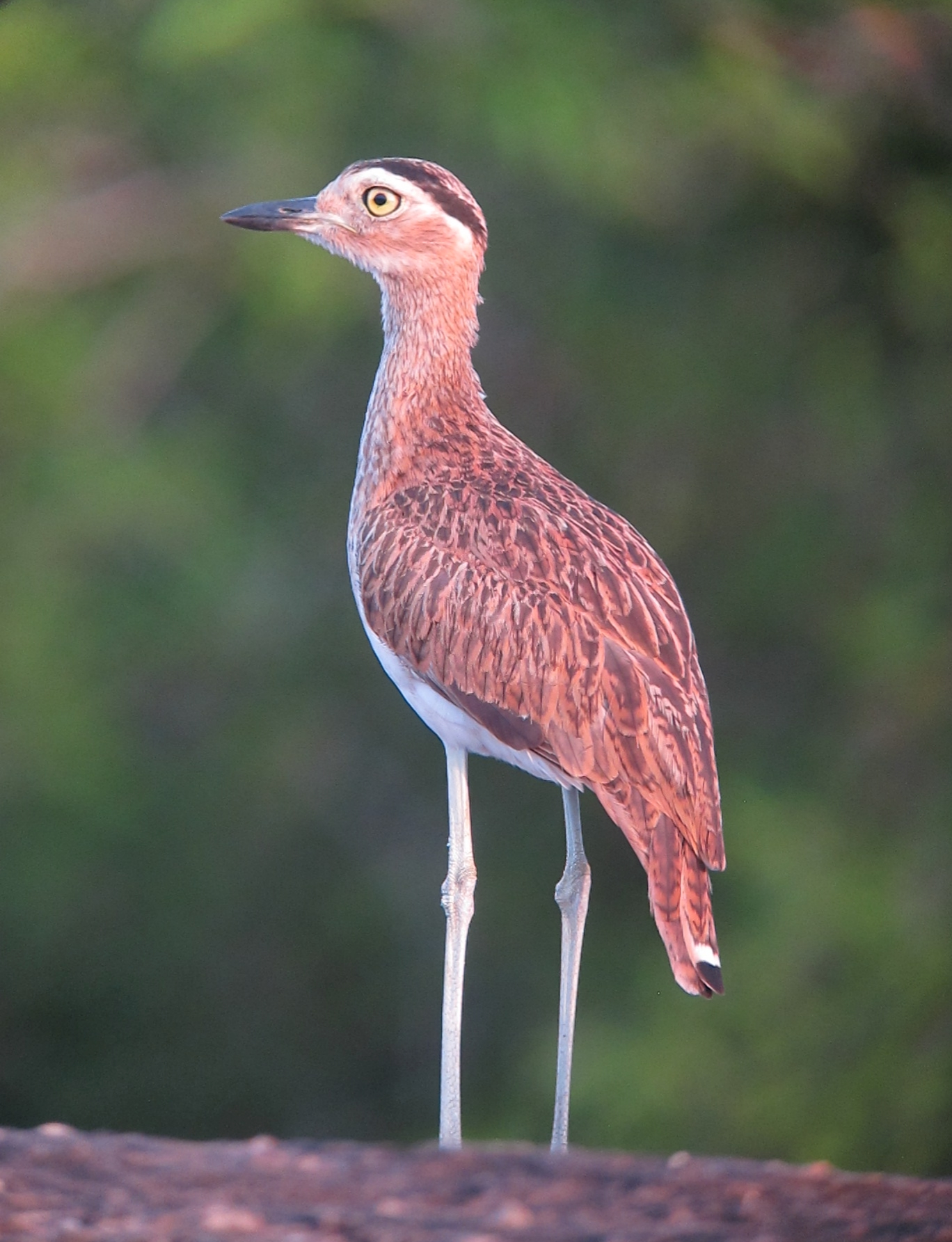
- Double-striped thick-knee (H. bistriatus)

Scientific classification
- Kingdom: Animalia
- Phylum: Chordata
- Class: Aves
- Order: Charadriiformes
- Family: Burhinidae
- Genus: Hesperoburhinus; Černý, van Els, Natale & Gregory, 2023

Type species
- Charadrius bistriatus Wagler, 1829

= Hesperoburhinus =

Genus of birds

Hesperoburhinus is a genus of birds in the stone-curlew family Burhinidae. The genus is distributed in Middle and South America. It contains two species, the double-striped thick-knee and the Peruvian thick-knee.

== Taxonomy and phylogeny ==
The genus Hesperoburhinus was introduced in 2023 by American ornithologists David Černý, Rossy Natale, American and Dutch ornithologist Paul van Els, and British ornithologist Steven Martin Stewart Gregory to accommodate the double-striped thick-knee and the Peruvian thick-knee. The name is from Ancient Greek hésperos (ἑσπερος, means "western"), and the pre-existing name Burhinus, because it is the only genus of the stone-curlew family Burhinidae which is distributed in the Western Hemisphere.

=== Species ===
The genus contains two species:

Genus Hesperoburhinus – Černý, van Els, Natale & Gregory, 2023 – two species
| Common name | Scientific name and subspecies | Range | Size and ecology | IUCN status and estimated population |
|---|---|---|---|---|
| Double-striped thick-knee | Hesperoburhinus bistriatus (Wagler, 1829) Four subspecies: H. b. bistriatus (Wagler, 1829); H. b. vocifer (L'Herminier, 1837); H. b. pediacus (Wetmore & Borrero), 1964; H. b. dominicensis (Cory, 1883) | northern Hispaniola (Dominican Republic and Haiti) and southern Mexico south to Colombia, Venezuela and northern Brazil | Size: Habitat: Diet: | LC |
| Peruvian thick-knee | Hesperoburhinus superciliaris (Tschudi, 1843) | Chile, Ecuador, and Peru | Size: Habitat: Diet: | VU |

=== Phylogeny ===
- Chionidi
  - Chionidae
    - Pluvianellus socialis
    - - Chionis albus
      - Chionis minor
  - Burhinidae
    - Hesperoburhinus
      - H. bistriatus
      - H. superciliaris
    - - Esacus
        - E. magnirostris
        - E. recurvirostris
      - Burhinus
        - B. capensis
        - - B. vermiculatus
          - - B. grallarius
            - - B. oedicnemus
              - B. senegalensis
