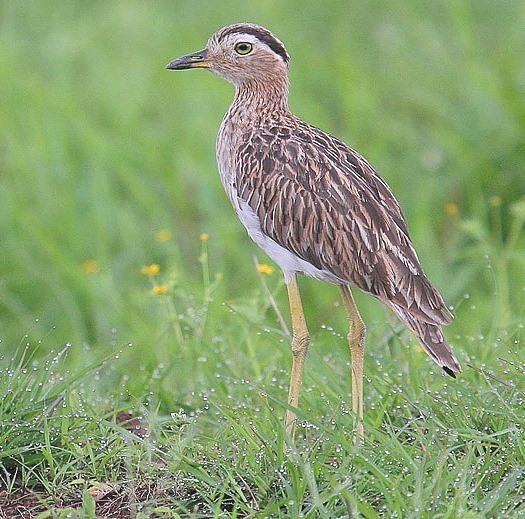

Conservation status
- Least Concern (IUCN 3.1)

Scientific classification
- Kingdom: Animalia
- Phylum: Chordata
- Class: Aves
- Order: Charadriiformes
- Family: Burhinidae
- Genus: Hesperoburhinus
- Species: H. bistriatus

Binomial name
- Hesperoburhinus bistriatus (Wagler, 1829)
- range (year-round resident)

= Double-striped thick-knee =

Species of bird

The double-striped thick-knee (Hesperoburhinus bistriatus) is a stone-curlew, a group of waders in the family Burhinidae. The vernacular name refers to the prominent joints in the long greenish-grey legs, and bistriatus to the two stripes of the head pattern.

== Taxonomy ==
The double-striped thick-knee was formally described in 1829 by the German naturalist Johann Georg Wagler from a specimen collected in Mexico. He coined the binomial name Charadrius bistriatus. The specific epithet bistriatus combines the Latin bi- meaning "two-" or "double-" with striatus meaning "stripe". The double-striped thick-knee was moved to the genus Burhinus that was erected by the German zoologist Johann Karl Wilhelm Illiger in 1811. In IOC 14.1, the double-striped thick-knee was transferred to the newly described genus Hesperoburhinus.

Four subspecies are recognised:

- H. b. bistriatus (Wagler, 1829) – south Mexico to northwest Costa Rica
- H. b. vocifer (L'Herminier, 1837) – Venezuela, Guyana and north Brazil
- H. b. pediacus (Wetmore & Borrero), 1964 – north Colombia
- H. b. dominicensis (Cory, 1883) – Hispaniola (Dominican Republic and Haiti)

== Description ==
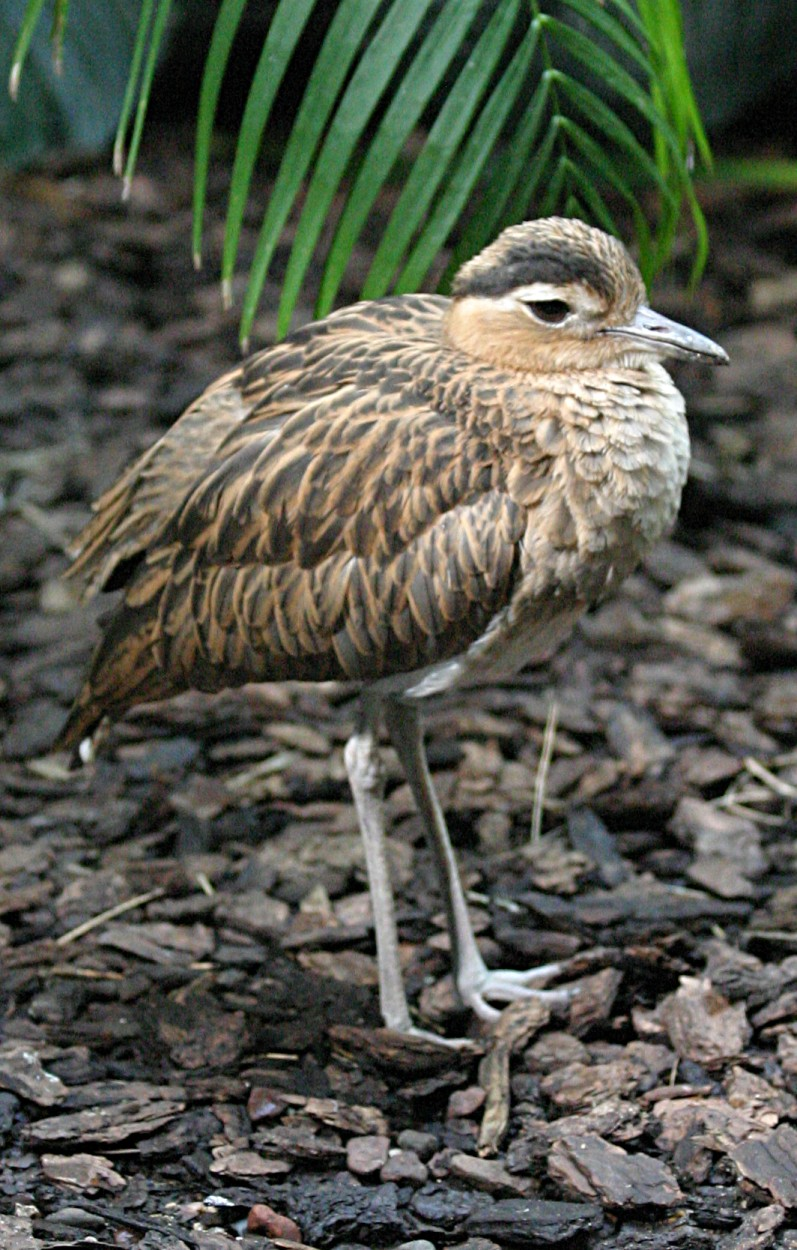
At the Milwaukee County Zoological Gardens

The double-striped thick-knee is a medium-large wader with a strong black and yellow bill, large yellow eyes, and cryptic plumage. The adult is about 46 to 50 cm (18–20 in) long and weighs about 780 to 785 g (27.5–27.7 oz). It has finely streaked grey-brown upperparts, and a paler brown neck and breast merging into the white belly. The head has a strong white supercilium bordered above by a black stripe. Juveniles are similar to adults, but have slightly darker brown upperparts and a whitish nape. The double-striped thick-knee is striking in flight, with a white patch on the dark upperwing, and a white underwing with a black rear edge.

The four subspecies differ in size and plumage tone, but individual variation makes identification of subspecies difficult.

== Distribution and habitat ==
It is a resident breeder in Central and South America from southern Mexico south to Colombia, Venezuela and northern Brazil. It also occurs on Hispaniola and some of the Venezuelan Caribbean islands, and is a very rare vagrant to Trinidad, Curaçao and the USA. It prefers arid grassland, savanna, and other dry, open habitats.

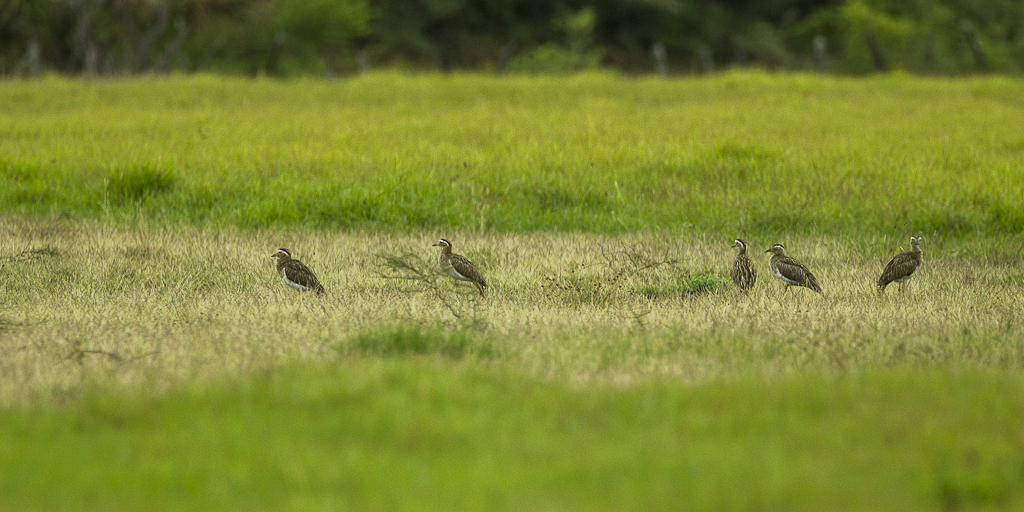
A troop of double-striped thick-knees on a pasture in Mexico

== Behaviour ==
This is a largely nocturnal and crepuscular species. It flies only reluctantly, relying on crouching and camouflage for concealment. The double-striped thick-knee eats large insects and other small vertebrate and invertebrate prey. It is sometimes semi-domesticated because of its useful function in controlling insects, and has benefited from the clearing of woodlands to create pasture. The song, given at night, is a loud kee-kee-kee.

=== Breeding ===
The nest is a bare scrape into which two olive-brown eggs are laid and incubated by both adults for 25–27 days to hatching. The downy young are precocial and soon leave the nest.

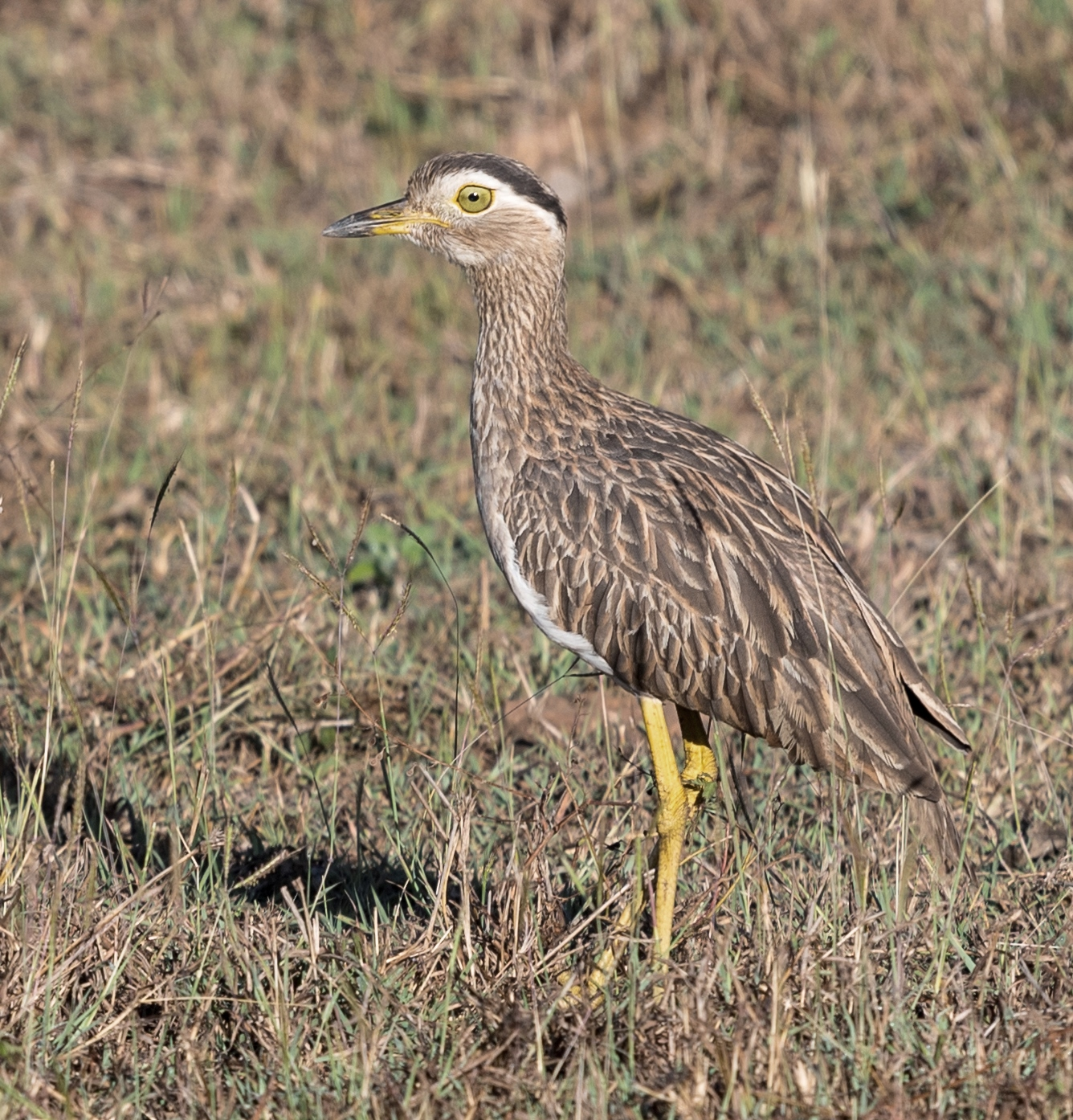
In Costa Rica
