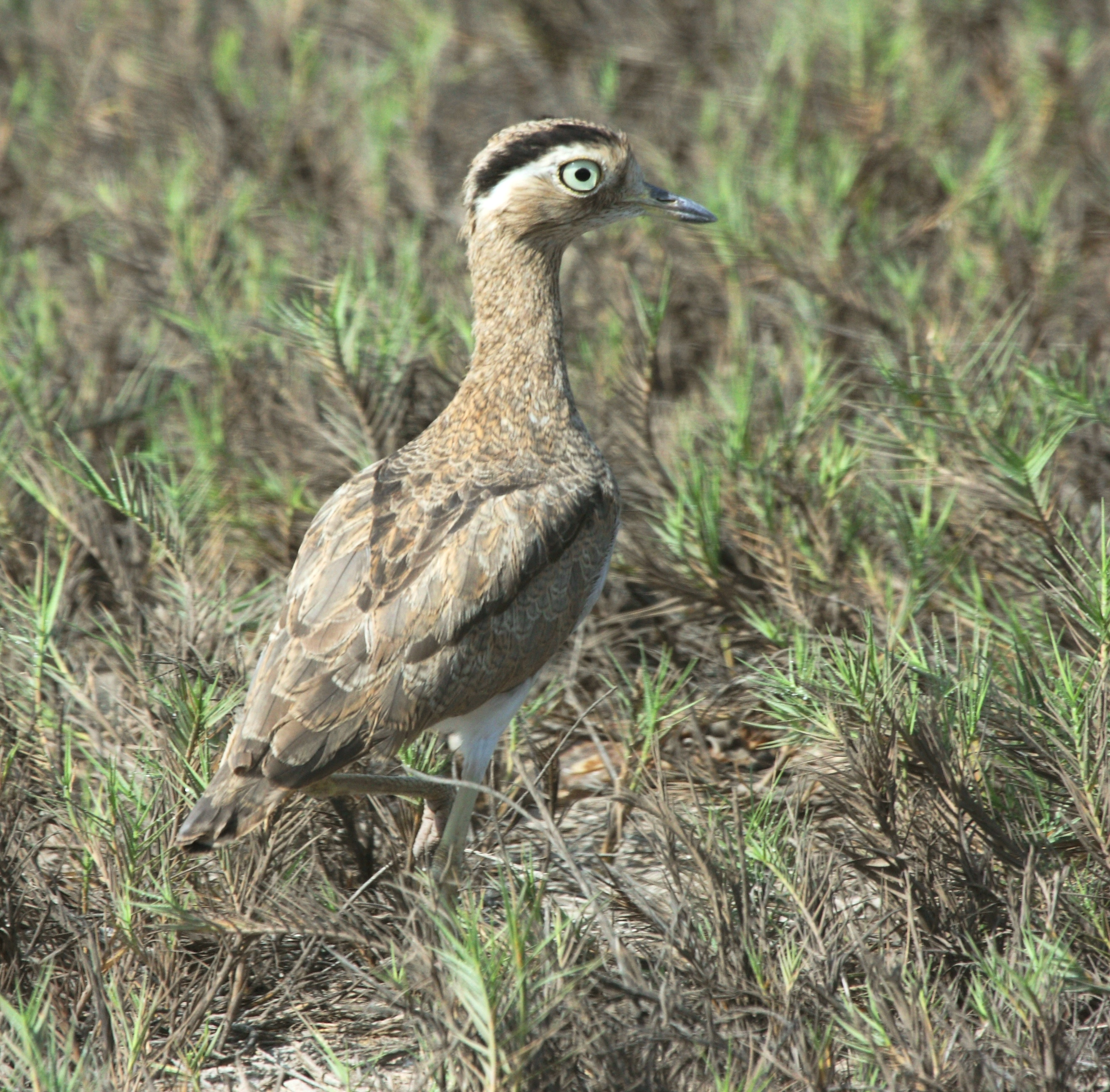
- at Santa Cruz de Flores, Lima, Peru

Conservation status
- Vulnerable (IUCN 3.1)

Scientific classification
- Kingdom: Animalia
- Phylum: Chordata
- Class: Aves
- Order: Charadriiformes
- Family: Burhinidae
- Genus: Hesperoburhinus
- Species: H. superciliaris

Binomial name
- Hesperoburhinus superciliaris (Tschudi, 1843)
- range (year-round resident)

= Peruvian thick-knee =

Species of bird

The Peruvian thick-knee (Hesperoburhinus superciliaris) is a species of bird in the family Burhinidae. It is found in Chile, Ecuador, and Peru. Its natural habitats are subtropical or tropical dry shrubland, subtropical or tropical seasonally wet or flooded lowland grassland, and pastureland. It is a ground-dwelling bird and feeds on insects and small animals.

== Taxonomy ==
The Peruvian thick-knee was formally described in 1843 by the Swiss naturalist Johann Jakob von Tschudi from a specimen collected in the coastal region of Peru. He coined the binomial name Oedicnenus superciliaris (the genus name is a typographic error for Oedicnemus). The specific epithet is Modern Latin meaning "eyebrowed" (supercilium is the Latin word for "eyebrow"). The Peruvian thick-knee is now placed in the genus Burhinus that was erected in 1811 by the German zoologist Johann Karl Wilhelm Illiger. In IOC 14.1, the Peruvian thick-knee was transferred to the newly described genus Hesperoburhinus. The species is monotypic: no subspecies are recognised.

== Description ==
This medium-sized bird has brownish-grey plumage with brown streaks and spots. The underparts are white and the legs are yellow and long. There is a white streak through the eye with a black upper border. The short beak has a black tip. The length is about 40 cm (16 in).

== Distribution and habitat ==
The Peruvian thick-knee is found in South America in the coastal strip between the Pacific Ocean and the Andes. Its range extends from northern Chile, through Peru to southern Ecuador. Its typical habitat is semi-desert areas, agricultural land, dry pasture or well-vegetated river valleys. It particularly favours open crops such as alfalfa or corn.

== Behaviour ==
The Peruvian thick-knee is most active at night. The diet is not known but the bird moves about on the ground foraging, probably feeding on insects, small lizards and other small animals. It runs across the ground in a manner similar to an ostrich. It roosts in the open during the day, remaining motionless and difficult to spot as it is well-camouflaged by its brownish plumage. Its presence in an area may be most easily detected by its distinctive three-toed footprints in soft sand, and at night by its calls which are somewhat reminiscent of a lapwing (Vanellus sp.).

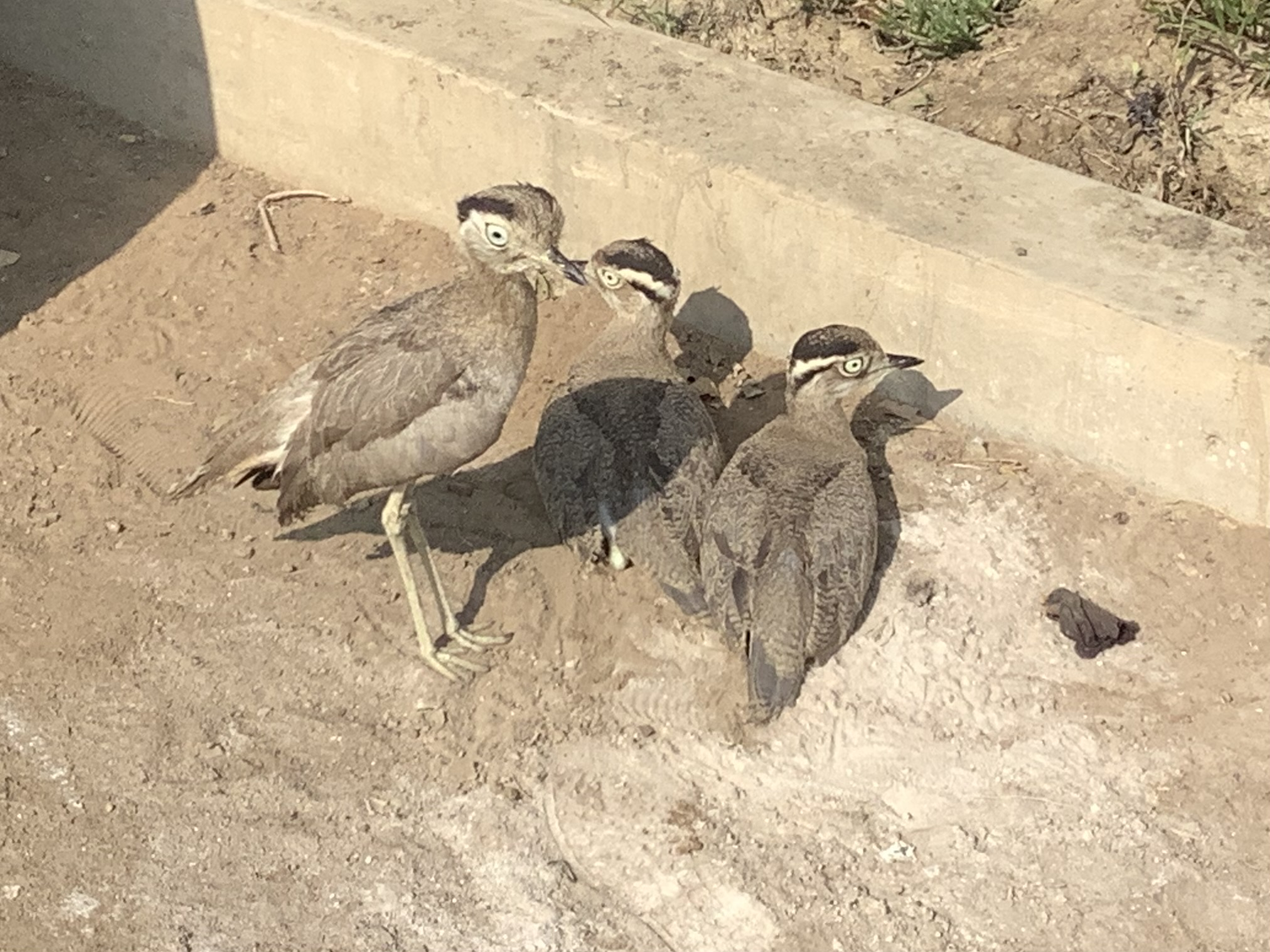
An adult with two fledglings in a dirt parking lot in Lima, Peru

Little is known of the reproduction of this species but a nest containing two eggs has been observed in June on the Cerros de Naupe, a range of low mountains in Peru. The nesting site was on a dry, sparsely-vegetated slope with clumps of shrubs and cacti. The nest was a scrape in the ground with the area around it cleared of debris. The eggs were cream-coloured with blotches of tan and darker brown and measured approximately 53 by 39 millimetres (2.1 in × 1.5 in). One parent was incubating the eggs while the other stood in the shade a few metres away. Peruvian thick-knees are more likely to stay in large flocks year round in Chile than in Peru, where flocks increase after breeding. Variations in flocking behaviour over the species range may be influenced by differences in local predation, foraging and climate pressures.

== Status ==
The IUCN lists the Peruvian thick-knee as Vulnerable due to its declining, small population (2,700 – 3,600 mature individuals as of 2024) and restricted range.
