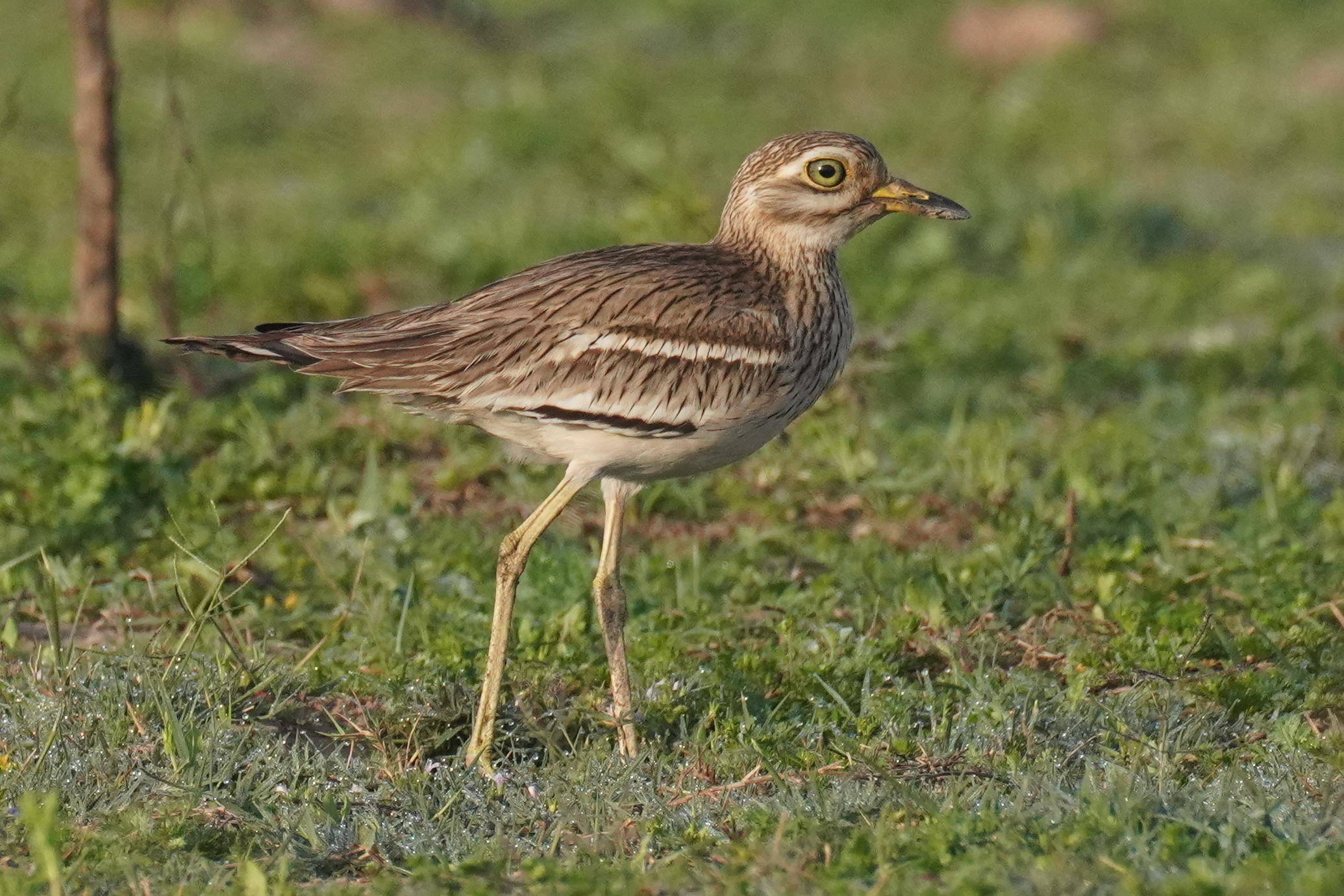

Conservation status
- Least Concern (IUCN 3.1)

Scientific classification
- Kingdom: Animalia
- Phylum: Chordata
- Class: Aves
- Order: Charadriiformes
- Family: Burhinidae
- Genus: Burhinus
- Species: B. indicus

Binomial name
- Burhinus indicus (Salvadori, 1866)
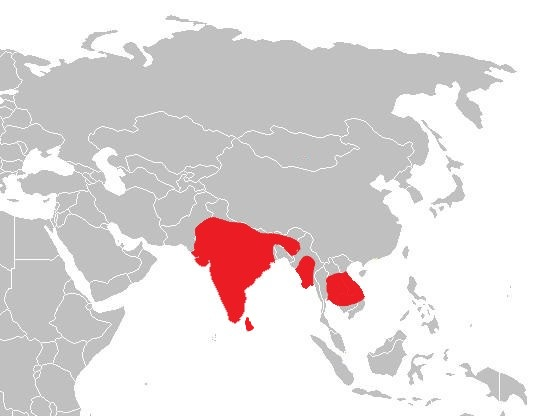
- range

Synonyms
- Oedicnemus indicus; Burhinus oedicnemus indicus

Audio
- Calls

= Indian stone-curlew =

Species of bird in the family Burhinidae

The Indian stone-curlew or Indian thick-knee (Burhinus indicus) is a species of bird in the family Burhinidae. It was formerly included as a subspecies of the Eurasian stone-curlew. This species is found in the plains of South and South-eastern Asia. They have large eyes and are brown with streaks and pale marks making it hard to spot against the background of soils and rocks. Mostly active in the dark, they produce calls similar to the true curlews, giving them their names.

== Taxonomy ==
The Indian stone-curlew was formally described in 1866 by the Italian zoologist Tommaso Salvadori based on specimens obtained in India. He coined the binomial name Oedicnemus indicus. The specific epithet is Latin meaning "Indian". The Indian stone-curlew is now placed in the genus Burhinus that was erected in 1811 by the German zoologist Johann Karl Wilhelm Illiger in 1811. The species is monotypic: no subspecies are recognised.

This species was formerly treated as a subspecies of the Eurasian stone-curlew Burhinus oedicnemus but the Indian population is distinctive in plumage, and non-migratory, leading to its being treated as a full species by Pamela Rasmussen in 2005. There has however been no major phylogenetic study of the genus.

== Description ==
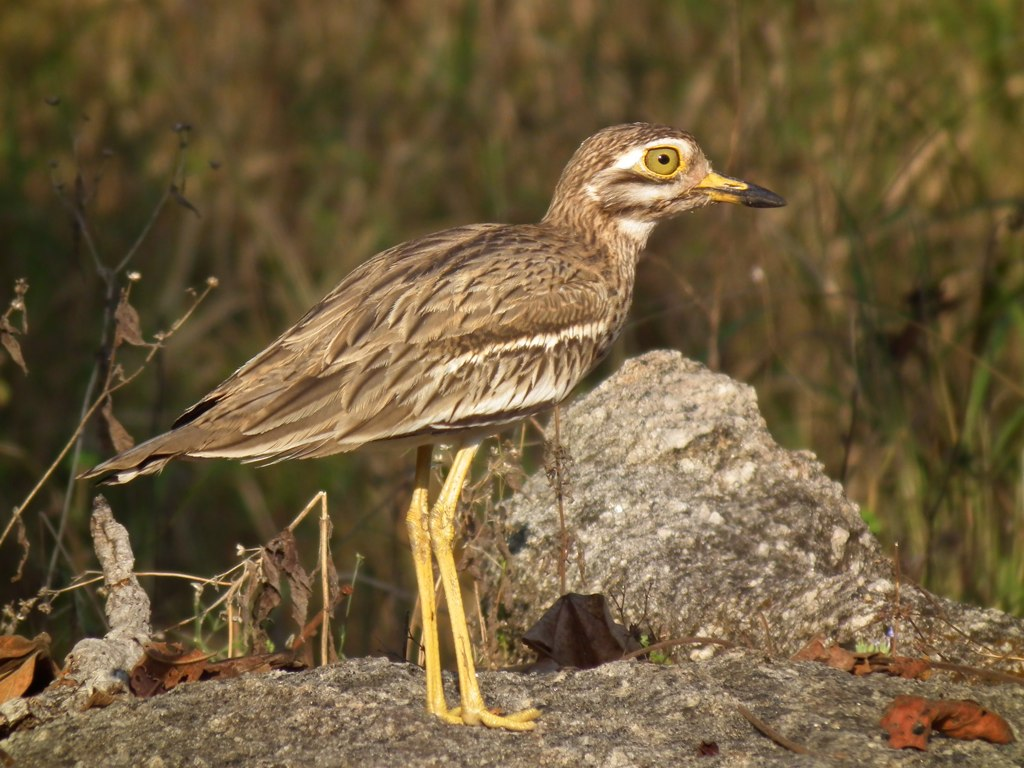
The large eyes indicate nocturnality

This stocky and brown ground bird with large eyes is about 41 centimeters in length. It has dark streaks on a sandy brown ground colour and is plover-like. The large head has a dark stripe bordering a creamy moustachial stripe below the eye. There is also a narrow creamy supercilium. The legs are stout and the knees are thick, giving them the group of name of "thick-knee". They have large yellow eyes. The sexes are alike and the immature is paler than adult with more marked buff and streaks on the underparts. In flight, they have two prominent white and a white patch on the darker primaries and at rest a broad pale band is visible on the wing.

The Indian stone curlew is active mainly at dawn and dusk and it calls mainly at night. The call is a series of sharp whistling notes pick-pick-pick-pick ending sometimes like pick-wick, pick-wick. They are found in small groups and during the day, they are found standing still under the shade of bush.

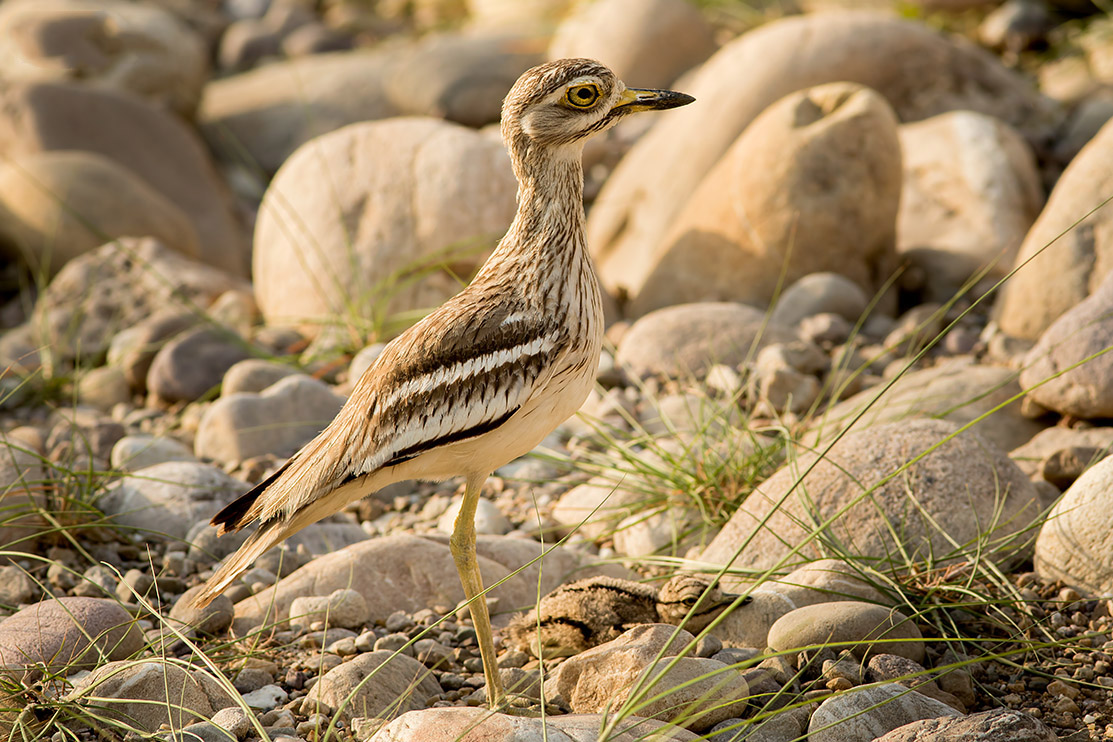
Adult with chick crouching beside it

== Distribution and habitat ==
Found in dry deciduous forests and thorn forest, scrubby riverbeds, groves and even gardens. This species is restricted to Bangladesh, Bhutan, Cambodia, India, Laos, Myanmar, Nepal, Pakistan, Sri Lanka, Thailand and Viet Nam. It is found in thin dry deciduous forest, scrub, stony hillsides and fallow lands.

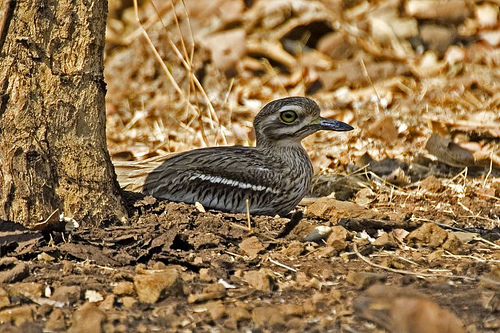
Roosting in shade

== Behaviour ==
=== Breeding ===
The breeding season is mainly March and April. The normal clutch is 2 to 3 stone colored eggs laid inside a scrape on bare ground, sometimes at the base of a bush. The eggs are incubate mainly by the female with male standing guard nearby. The nidifugous chicks are downy and cryptically coloured and follow the parents soon after hatching. The young chicks freeze and crouch when alarmed and the cryptic plumage makes them hard to detect.

=== Food and feeding ===
The diet mainly consists of insects, worms and small reptiles and occasionally some seeds.
