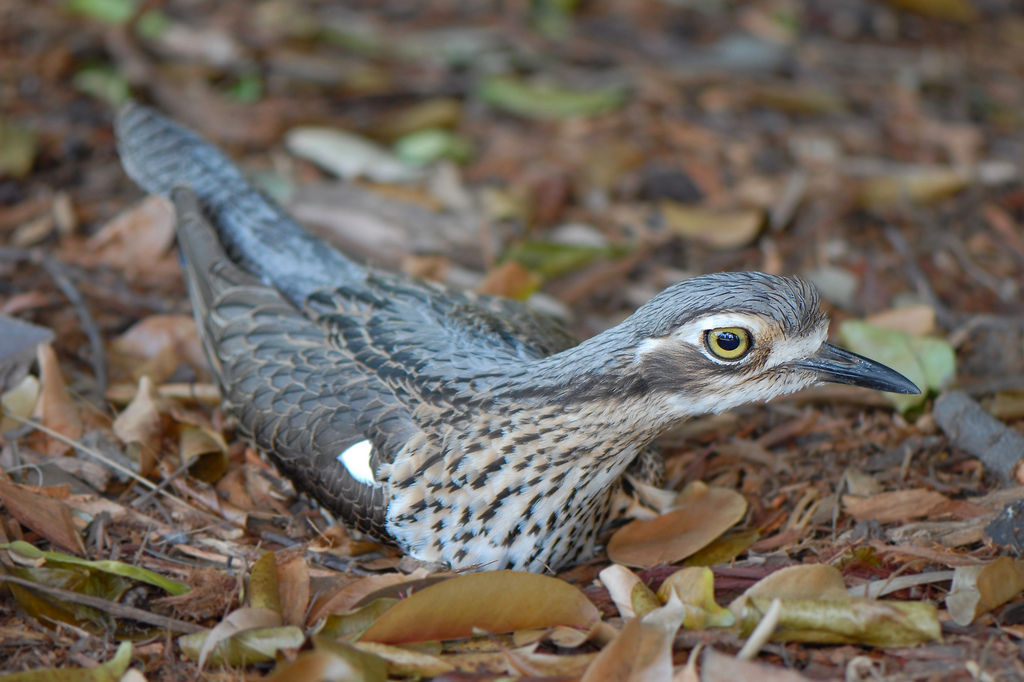
- Bush stone-curlew, Burhinus grallarius

Scientific classification
- Kingdom: Animalia
- Phylum: Chordata
- Class: Aves
- Order: Charadriiformes
- Suborder: Charadrii
- Family: Burhinidae; Mathews, 1912

Genera
- Hesperoburhinus; Burhinus; Esacus; †Genucrassum
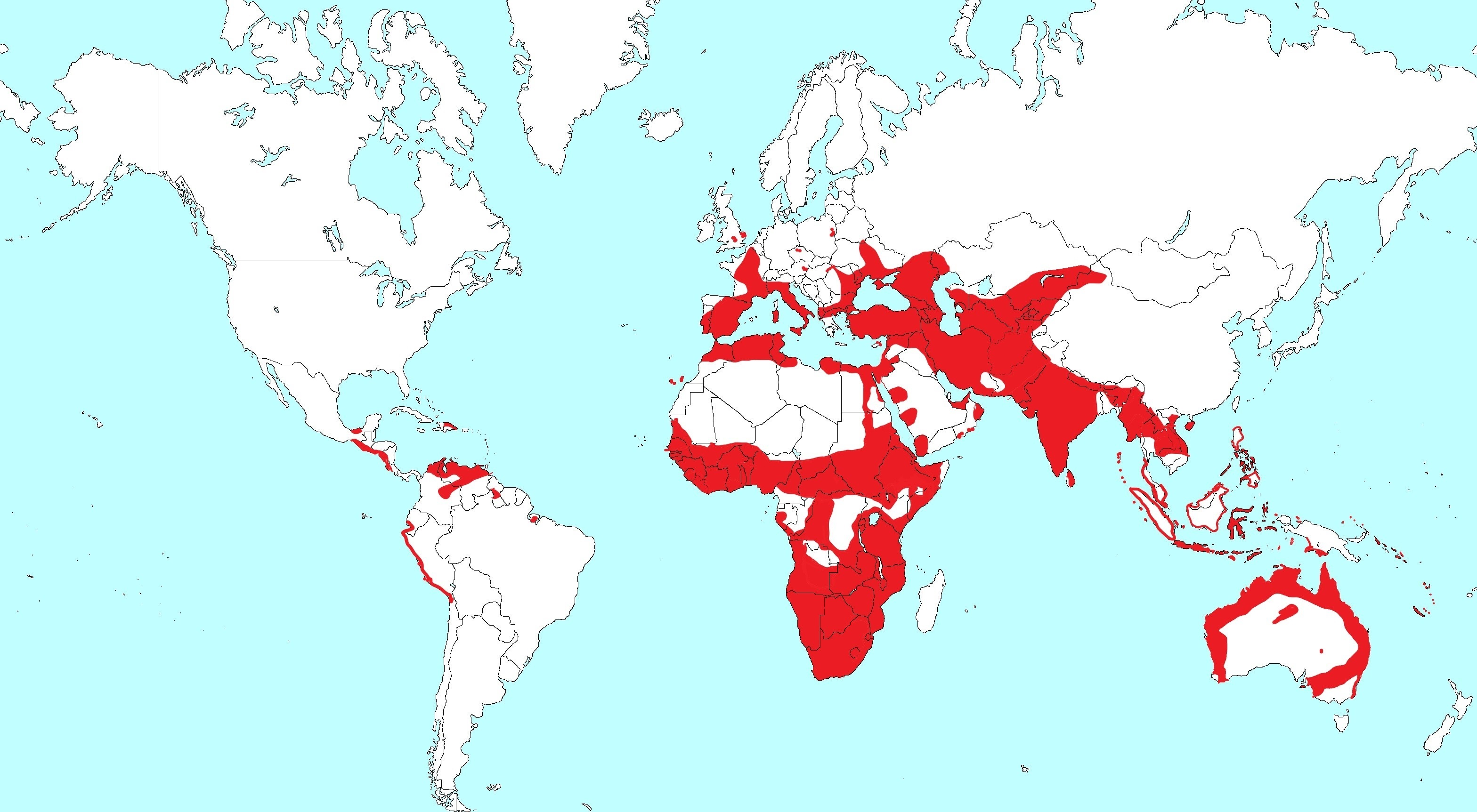
- modern range

= Stone-curlew =

Stone-curlews Temporal range: Late Oligocene–Present

Family of birds

The stone-curlews, also known as dikkops or thick-knees, consist of 10 species within the family Burhinidae, and are found throughout the tropical and temperate parts of the world, with two or more species occurring in some areas of Africa, Asia, and Australia. Despite the group being classified as waders, most species have a preference for arid or semiarid habitats.

== Taxonomy ==
The family Burhinidae was introduced in 1912 for the stone-curlews by Australian ornithologist Gregory Mathews. The family contains three genera: Hesperoburhinus, Burhinus and Esacus. The name Burhinus combines the Ancient Greek bous meaning "ox" and rhis, rhinos meaning "nose" (or "bill").

Molecular phylogenetic studies have shown that the family Burhinidae is sister to a clade containing the sheathbills in the family Chionidae and the Magellanic plover in its own family Pluvianellidae. The stone-curlews are not closely related to the curlews, genus Numenius, that belong to the sandpiper family Scolopacidae.

== Description ==
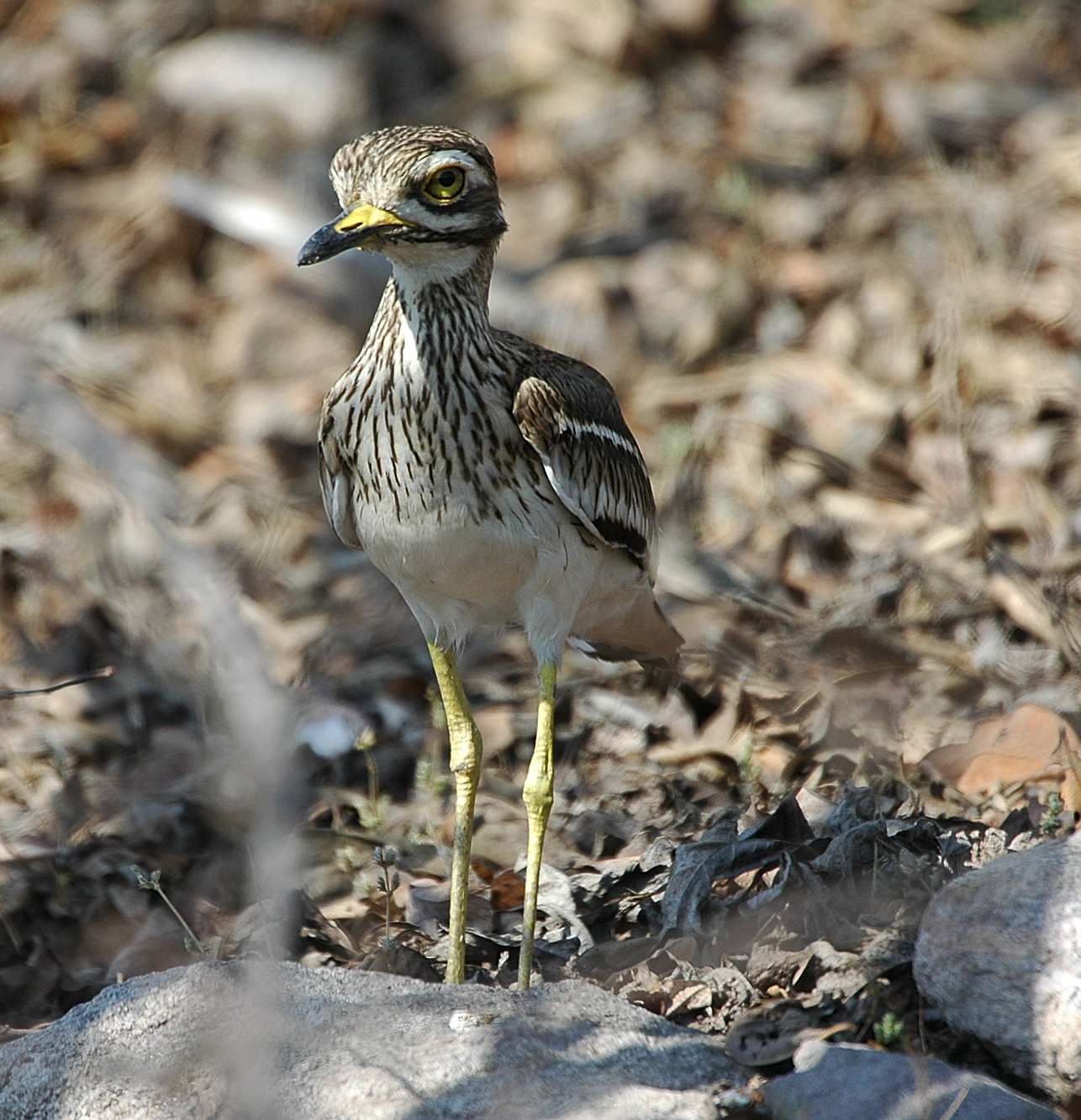

They are medium to large birds with strong black or yellow black bills, large yellow eyes—which give them a reptilian appearance—and cryptic plumage. The names thick-knee and stone-curlew are both in common use. The term stone-curlew owes its origin to the broad similarities with true curlews. Thick-knee refers to the prominent joints in the long yellow or greenish legs and apparently originated with a name coined in 1776 for B. oedicnemus, the Eurasian stone-curlew. Obviously the heel (ankle) and the knee are confused here.

== Behaviour ==
They are largely nocturnal, particularly when singing their loud, wailing songs, which are reminiscent of true curlews. Their diet consists mainly of insects and other invertebrates. Larger species also take lizards and even small mammals. Most species are sedentary, but the Eurasian stone-curlew is a summer migrant in the temperate European part of its range, wintering in Africa.

== Species ==
The living species are:

Picture	Name	Binomial name
	Double-striped thick-knee	Hesperoburhinus bistriatus
	Peruvian thick-knee	Hesperoburhinus superciliaris
	Eurasian stone-curlew	Burhinus oedicnemus
	Indian stone-curlew	Burhinus indicus
	Senegal thick-knee	Burhinus senegalensis
	Water thick-knee	Burhinus vermiculatus
	Spotted thick-knee	Burhinus capensis
	Bush stone-curlew	Burhinus grallarius (formerly B. magnirostris).
	Great stone-curlew	Esacus recurvirostris
	Beach stone-curlew	Esacus magnirostris

=== Fossil record ===
The earliest definitive stone-curlew is Genucrassum bransatensis from the Late Oligocene of France. Wilaru, described from the Late Oligocene to the Early Miocene of Australia, was originally classified as a stone-curlew, but was subsequently argued to be a member of the extinct anseriform family Presbyornithidae, instead.
