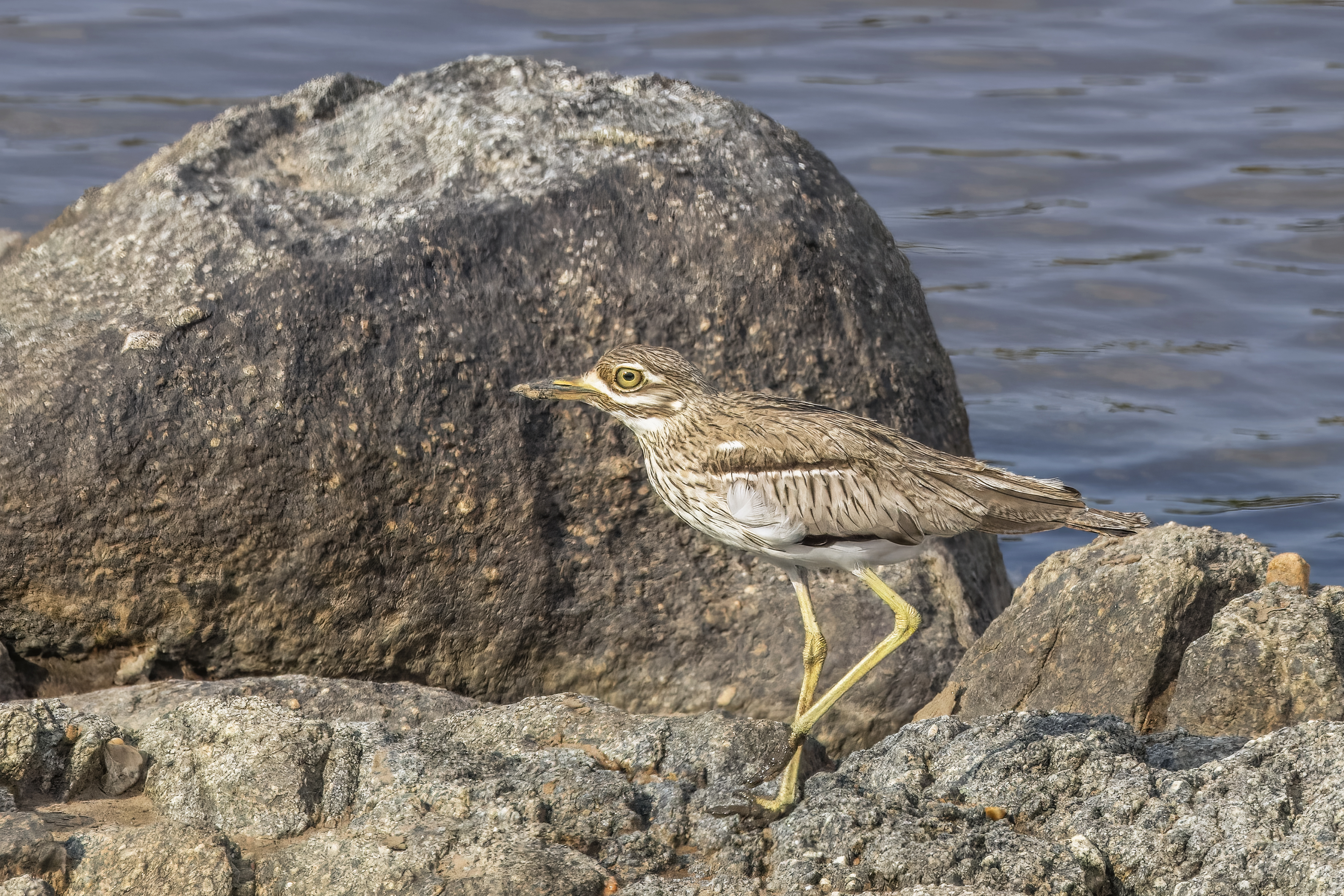
- B. v. vermiculatus Serengeti National Park, Tanzania

Conservation status
- Least Concern (IUCN 3.1)

Scientific classification
- Kingdom: Animalia
- Phylum: Chordata
- Class: Aves
- Order: Charadriiformes
- Family: Burhinidae
- Genus: Burhinus
- Species: B. vermiculatus

Binomial name
- Burhinus vermiculatus (Cabanis, 1868)
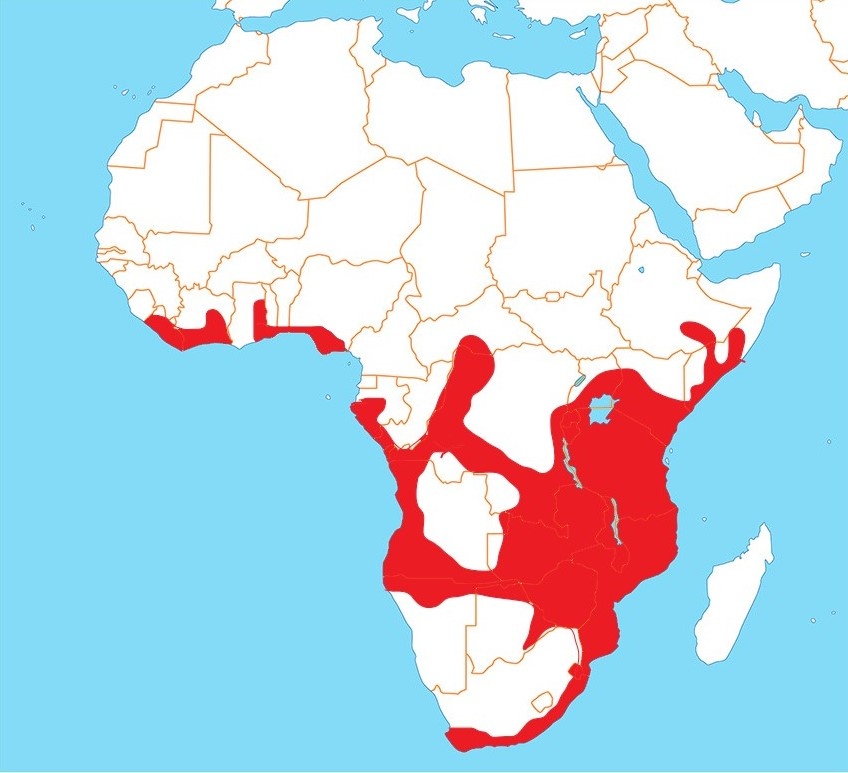
- resident range

= Water thick-knee =

Species of bird

The water thick-knee or water dikkop (Burhinus vermiculatus) is a species of bird in the thick-knee family Burhinidae. The species is found across sub-Saharan Africa, usually close to water.

== Distribution and habitat ==
The water thick-knee has a widespread distribution in sub-Saharan Africa, being found in Angola, Botswana, Burkina Faso, Burundi, Cameroon, Central African Republic, Republic of the Congo, Democratic Republic of the Congo, Eswatini, Ivory Coast, Ethiopia, Gabon, Ghana, Kenya, Liberia, Malawi, Mozambique, Namibia, Niger, Nigeria, Rwanda, Senegal, Somalia, South Africa, Tanzania, Uganda, Zambia, and Zimbabwe.

Across its range it is found on the edges of lakes, estuaries and rivers, as well as mangroves and also some sheltered beaches. It also needs bushes or nearby woodlands for shelter. It is found from sea-level to 1,800 m (5,900 ft).

== Subspecies ==
There are two accepted subspecies:

- Burhinus vermiculatus vermiculatus — Democratic Republic of Congo to Somalia and South Africa
- Burhinus vermiculatus buettikoferi (Reichenow, 1898) — Liberia to Gabon

== Description ==
The water thick-knee is 38 to 41 cm (15–16 in) and weighs 293–320 g (10.3–11.3 oz). It has a heavy bill that is black with some pale yellow from the nostril to the base. The wings are broad and blunt and the tail is short. Its legs are pale greenish yellow, and the iris colour greenish yellow with black tracing.

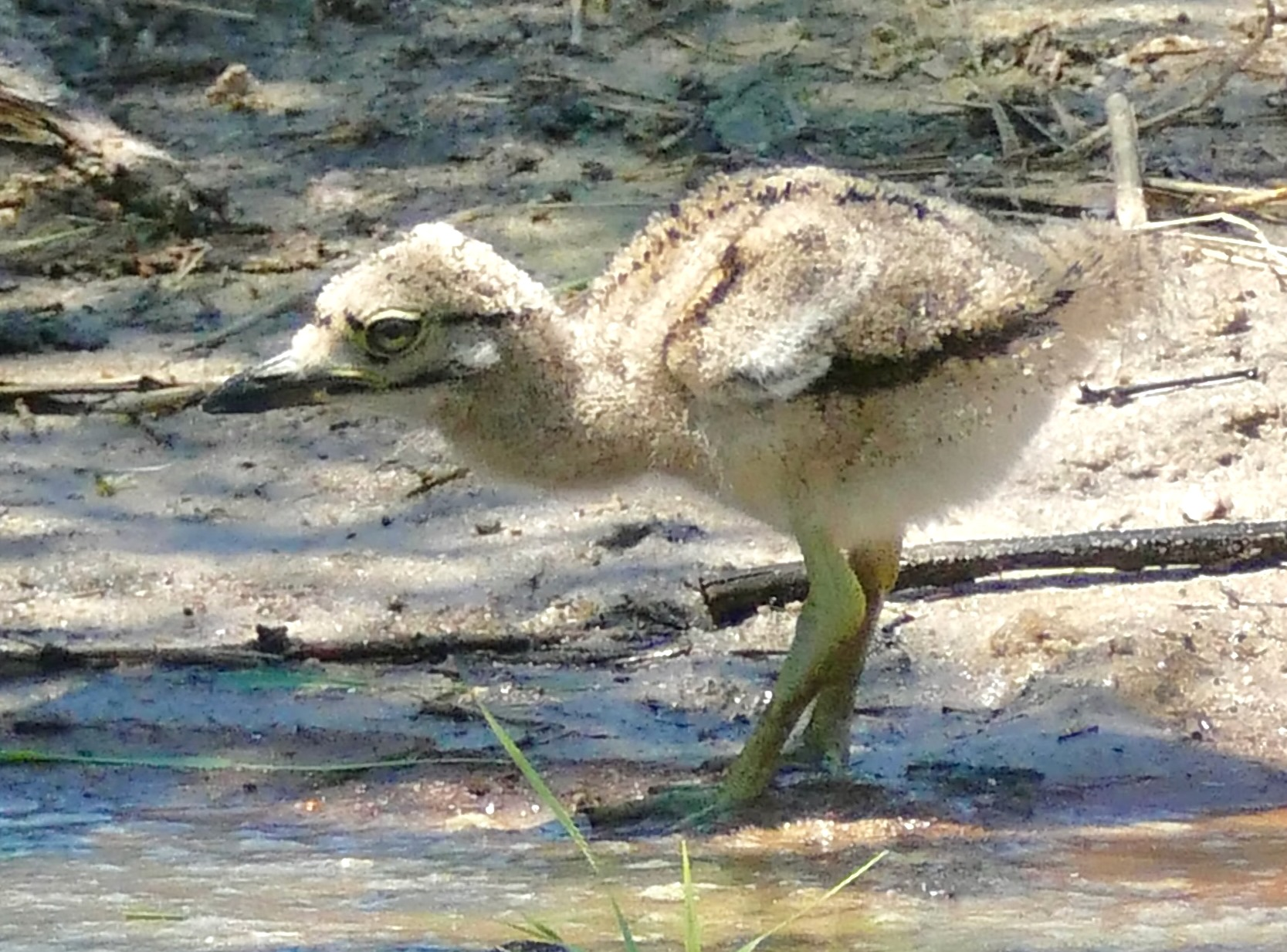
Chick

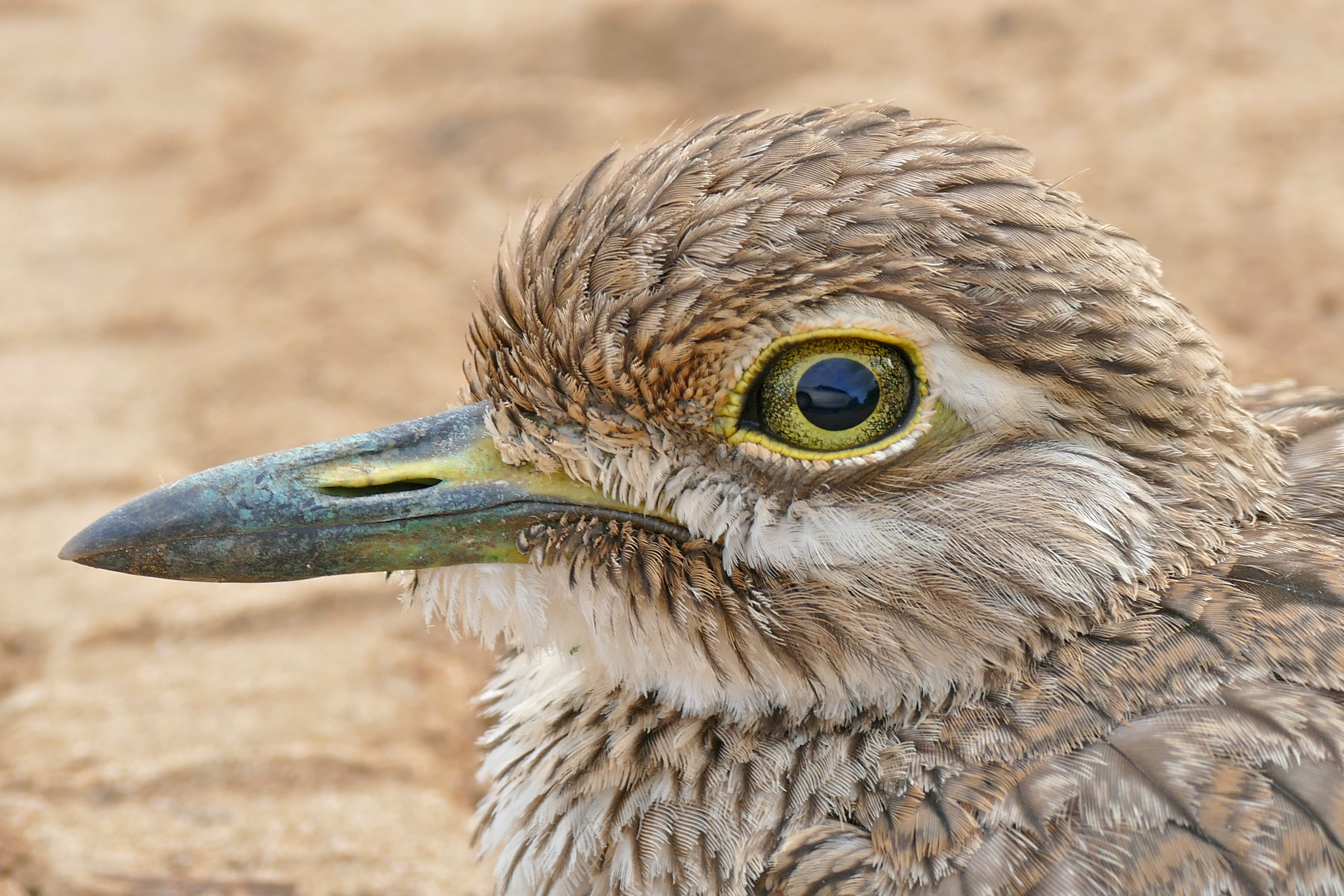
Close-up

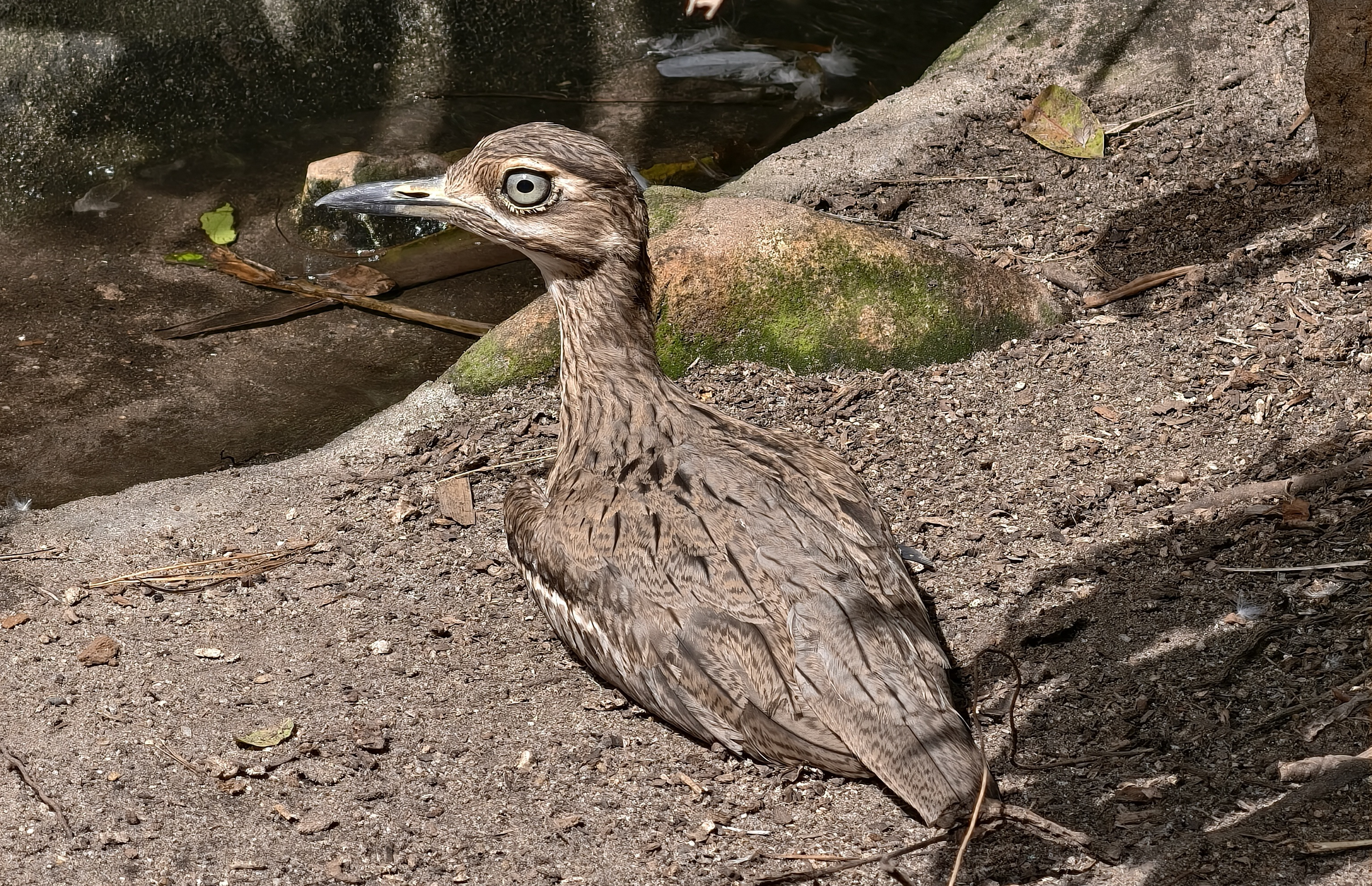
Hout Bay, South Africa

Back plumage, Zanzibar

== Behaviour ==
The water thick-knee is a terrestrial feeder that forages at night. Although it is typically associated with water it can be found foraging up to 1 km (0.62 mi) from water. It feeds on insects, crustaceans and mollusks.

The water thick-knee generally breeds in the dry season or early rainy season. It is a monogamous breeder with both parents guarding the nest and brooding the eggs. The nest is a simple scrape in sandy or stony ground, usually close to water. The clutch size is two sandy-yellow eggs. Both sexes incubate the eggs for 22-25 days, and both are responsible for feeding the young. Unique among birds, thick-knee pairs frequently nest adjacent to and sometimes directly on top of Nile crocodile nests. The two species share a form of symbiotic mutualism with the more energetic and vocal thick-knee functioning as loud sentries for the nests as the more powerful crocodile provides protection. Should a nest raider approach, the thick-knee pair will spread their wings in a threat display and harass and peck at the intruders to drive it off. If the pair not be successful, the mother crocodile will be drawn in by their continued calls and arrive.
