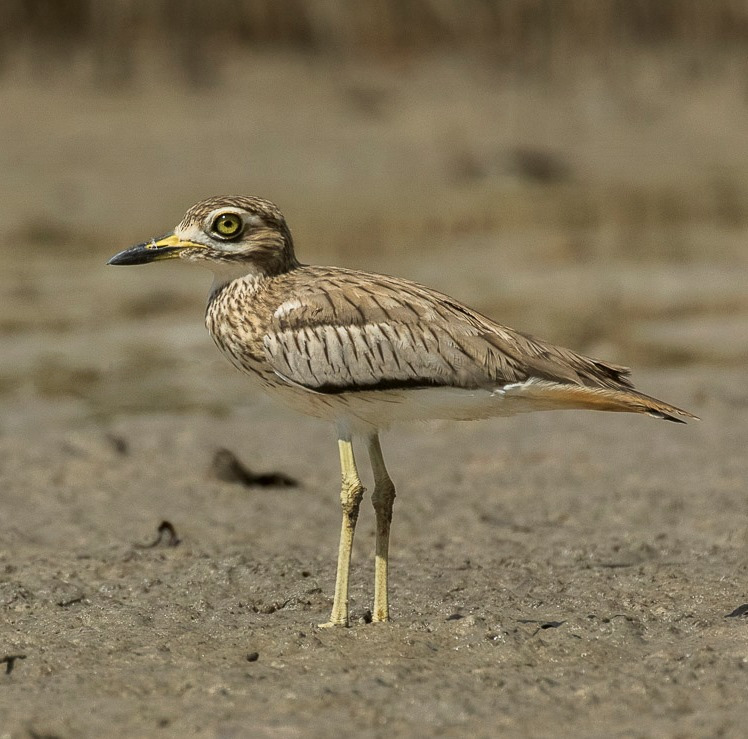
- In The Gambia

Conservation status
- Least Concern (IUCN 3.1)

Scientific classification
- Kingdom: Animalia
- Phylum: Chordata
- Class: Aves
- Order: Charadriiformes
- Family: Burhinidae
- Genus: Burhinus
- Species: B. senegalensis

Binomial name
- Burhinus senegalensis (Swainson, 1837)
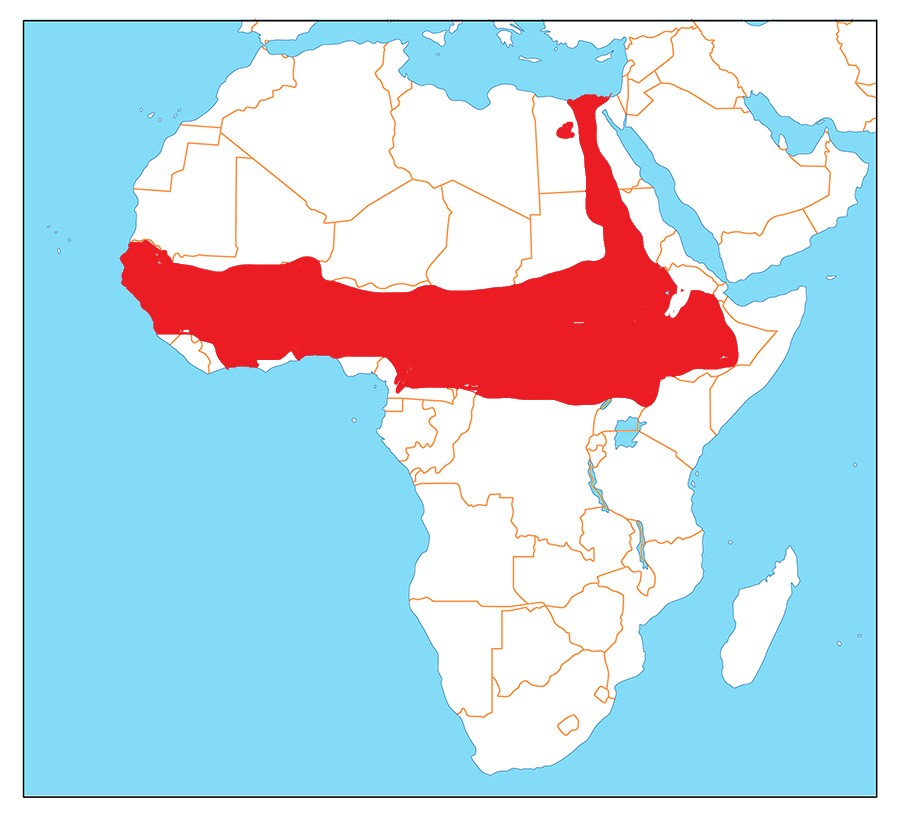
- range

= Senegal thick-knee =

Species of bird

The Senegal thick-knee (Burhinus senegalensis) is a stone-curlew, a group of waders in the family Burhinidae. Their vernacular scientific name refers to the prominent joints in the long yellow or greenish legs.

== Range ==
It is a resident breeder in Africa between the Sahara and the equator, and in the Nile valley.

== Description ==
in Egypt

Senegal thick-knees are medium-large waders with strong black and yellow black bills, large yellow eyes — which give them a reptilian appearance — and cryptic plumage. They are similar but slightly smaller than the Eurasian stone-curlew, which winters in Africa. The long dark bill, single black bar on the folded wing, and darker cheek stripe are distinctions from the European species. Senegal thick-knee is striking in flight, with a broad white wing bar.

== Habits and food ==
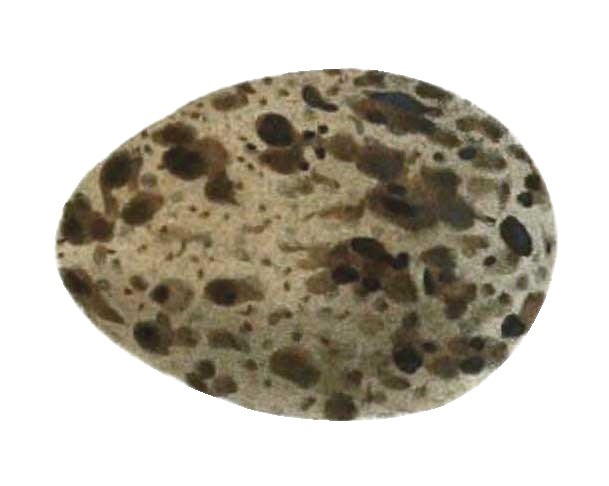
Illustration of egg

This species has a preference for dry open habitats with some bare ground, preferably near water. It lays two blotchy light brown eggs on a ground scrape. It is most active at dawn and dusk. The song is a loud pi-pi-pi-pi-pi-pi-pi.

Food is insects, crustaceans and other invertebrates. It will also take other small prey.
