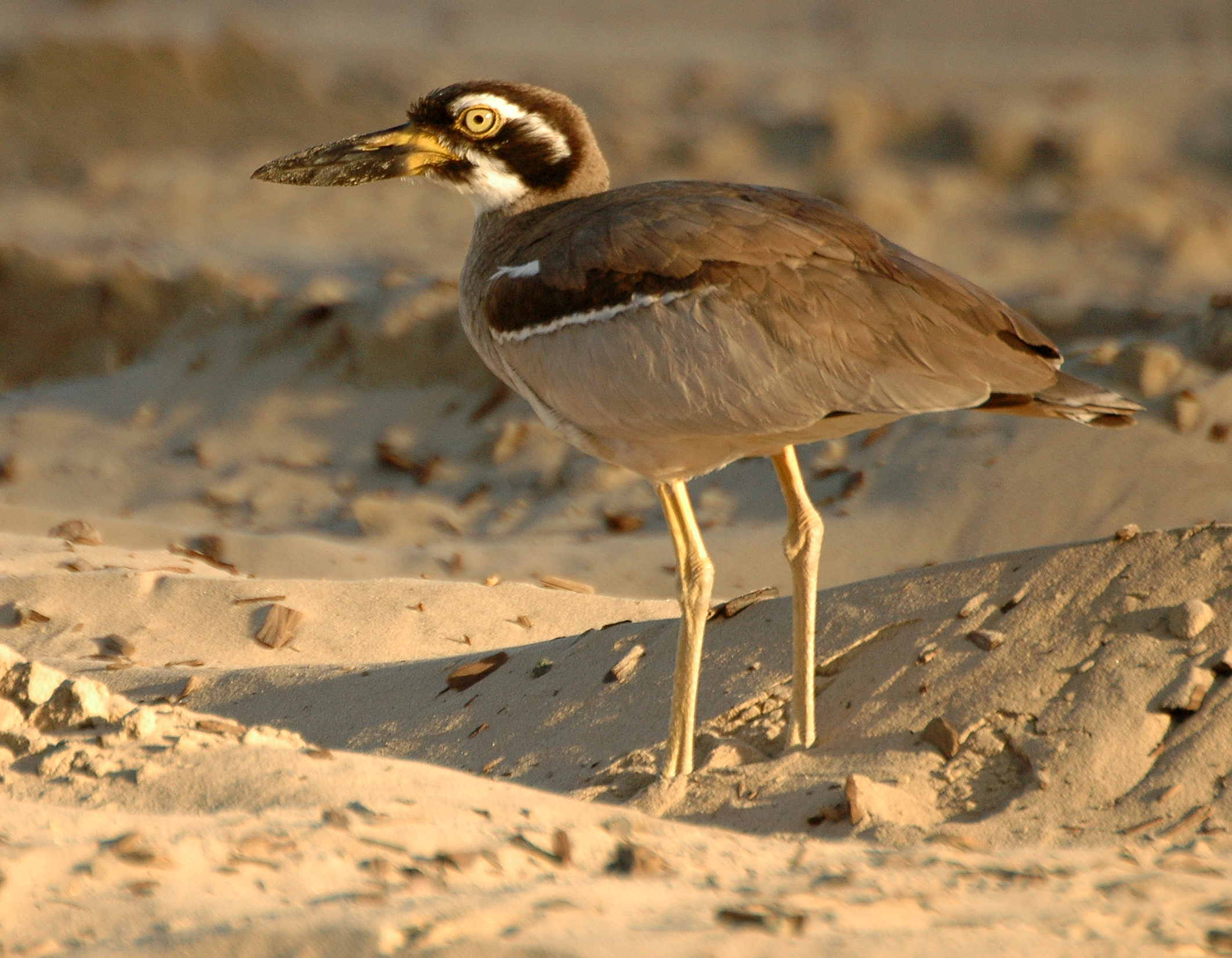
- Beach stone-curlew (E. magnirostris)

Scientific classification
- Kingdom: Animalia
- Phylum: Chordata
- Class: Aves
- Order: Charadriiformes
- Family: Burhinidae
- Genus: Esacus; Lesson, 1831

Type species
- Oedicnemus recurvirostris Cuvier, 1829
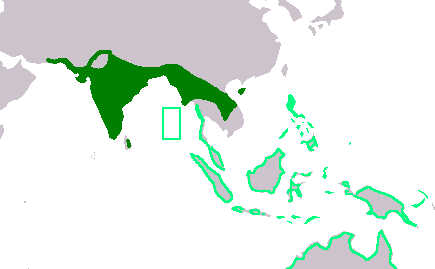
- E. recurvirostris range E. magnirostris range

= Esacus =

Genus of birds

Esacus is a genus of bird in the stone-curlew family Burhinidae. The genus is distributed from Pakistan and India to Australia. It contains two species, the great stone-curlew and the beach stone-curlew.

== Taxonomy ==
The genus Esacus was introduced (as a subgenus) in 1831 by the French naturalist René Lesson to accommodate the great stone-curlew. The name is from Ancient Greek aisakos an unidentified bird variously associated with a robin, a shorebird or a cormorant. In Greek mythology Aesacus was a son of King Priam of Troy. Aesacus sorrowed for the death of his wife or would-be lover, and was transformed into a bird.

== Species ==
The genus contains two species:

Genus Esacus – Lesson, 1831 – two species
Common name	Scientific name and subspecies	Range	Size and ecology	IUCN status and estimated population
Great stone-curlew or great thick-knee	Esacus recurvirostris (Cuvier, 1829)	India, Pakistan, Sri Lanka, Bangladesh into South-east Asia.	Size: Habitat: Diet:	LC
Beach stone-curlew, or beach thick-knee	Esacus magnirostris (Vieillot, 1818)	coastal eastern Australia as far south as far eastern Victoria, the northern Australian coast and nearby islands, New Guinea, New Caledonia, Indonesia, Malaysia, and the Philippines.	Size: Habitat: Diet:	NT

== Description ==
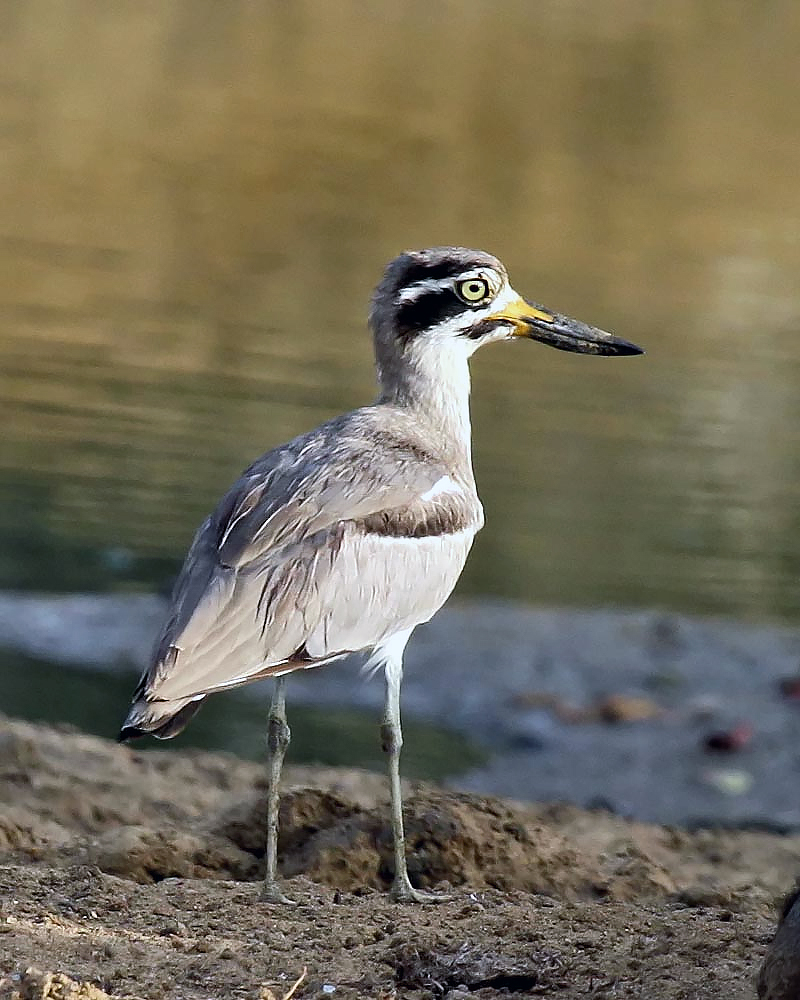
Great stone-curlew

The two species are larger and heavier-set than the stone-curlews of the genus Burhinus. They resemble small bustards, especially in flight, and have long and heavy bills and long legs.

== Distribution and habitat ==
The beach stone-curlew is found in coastal areas, as its name suggests, seldom found far from the coast. The great stone-curlew also favours water, often found close to large lakes or on the river shore. Like the Burhinus stone-curlews the great stone-curlew is nocturnal, but the beach-stone curlew is less so, and feeds during the day on beaches and islands. The beach curlew is found from the Andaman Is through Indonesia to Australia and New Caledonia. The great stone-curlew is found from coastal Iran and Pakistan through central India, Burma, Thailand to Hainan in China.

== Behaviour ==
They feed on crabs and other invertebrates; the great stone-curlew uses its large bill to overturn stones to find prey, and the beach stone-curlew uses its bill to break up crabs and eat them, which it catches by stalking them like a heron.

The Esacus stone-curlews make harsh wailing calls. The great stone-curlew is a seasonal breeder, timing it before the start of the monsoon. The timing of the beach stone-curlew is more variable across its large range. The beach stone-curlew is the only member of the family not to lay a clutch of two or three eggs, and lays a single egg.

== Status ==
Both species are listed as near threatened by the IUCN. They are threatened by habitat loss, introduced predators and disturbance of their breeding habitat.

== See also ==
- Stone-curlew
- Burhinus
- Great stone-curlew
- Beach stone-curlew
