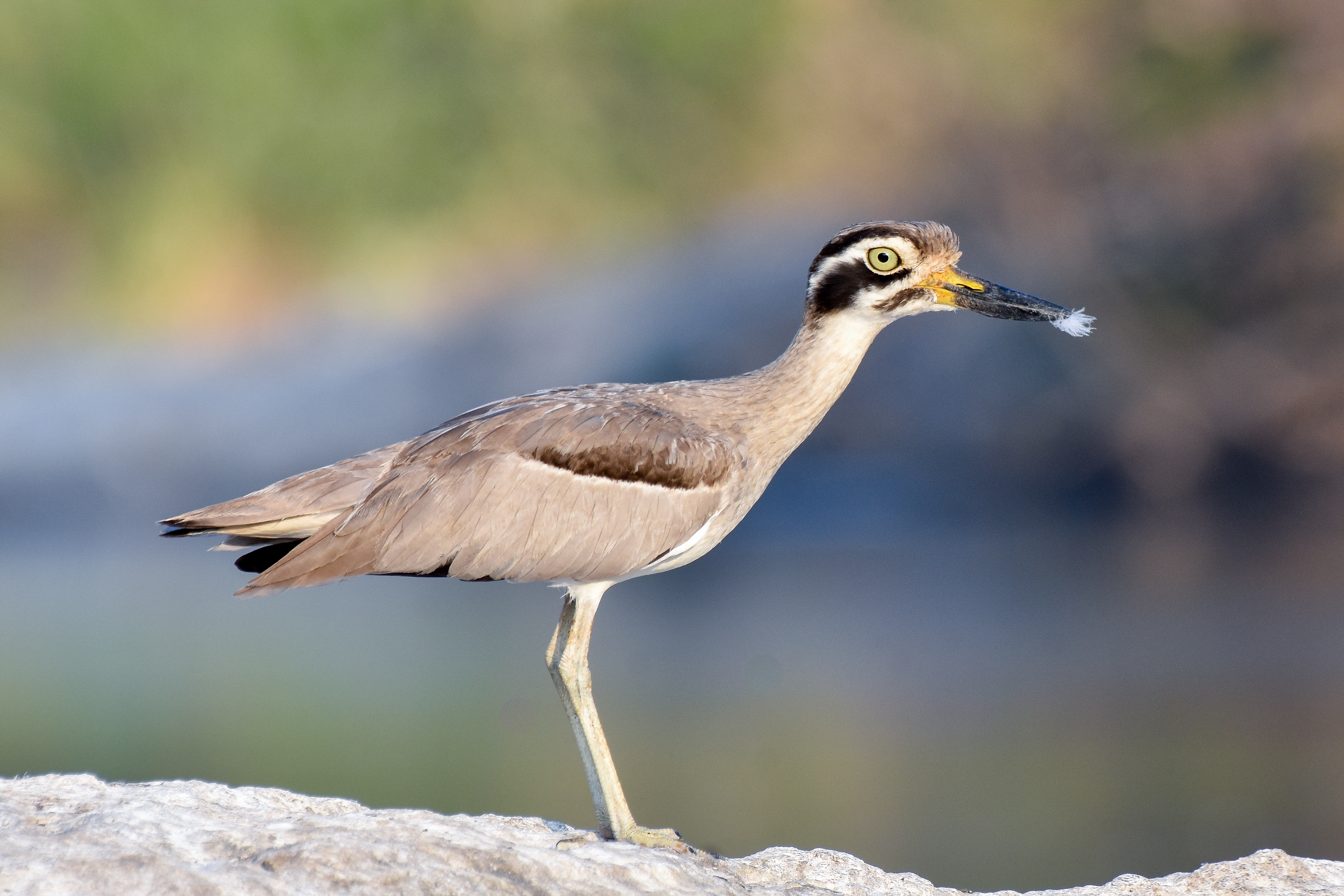
- Ranganathittu, Karnataka

Conservation status
- Near Threatened (IUCN 3.1)

Scientific classification
- Kingdom: Animalia
- Phylum: Chordata
- Class: Aves
- Order: Charadriiformes
- Family: Burhinidae
- Genus: Esacus
- Species: E. recurvirostris

Binomial name
- Esacus recurvirostris (Cuvier, 1829)
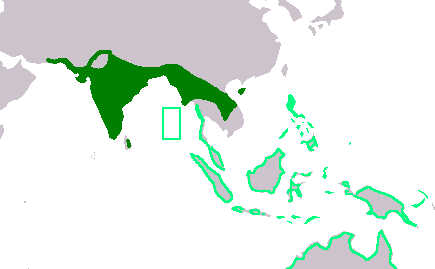
- E. recurvirostris range E. magnirostris range

= Great stone-curlew =

Species of bird

The great stone-curlew or great thick-knee (Esacus recurvirostris) is a large wader which is a resident breeder in tropical southern Asia from India, Pakistan, Sri Lanka, Bangladesh into South-east Asia.

== Taxonomy ==
The great stone-curlew was formally described in 1829 by the French naturalist Georges Cuvier and given the binomial name Oedicnemus recurvirostris. The type locality is Nepal. The specific epithet recurvirostris combines Latin recurvis meaning "bent backwards" with -rostris meaning "-billed". The species is now placed in the genus Esacus that was introduced in 1831 to accommodate the great stone-curlew by the French naturalist René Lesson. The species is monotypic: no subspecies are recognised.

== Description ==
The great thick-knee is a large wader at 49–55 cm, and has a massive 7 cm bill with the lower mandible with a sharp angle giving it an upturned appearance. It has unstreaked grey-brown upperparts and breast, with rest of the underparts whitish. The face has a striking black and white pattern, and the bill is black with a yellow base. The eyes are bright yellow and the legs a duller greenish-yellow. In flight, the great thick-knee shows black and white flight feathers on the upperwing, and a mainly white underwing. Sexes are similar, but young birds are slightly paler than adults.

== Behaviour ==
This species prefers gravel banks along rivers or large lakes, and also beaches. It is mainly nocturnal or crepuscular like other stone-curlews, but can frequently be seen foraging during the day, moving slowly and deliberately, with occasional short runs. It tends to be wary and flies off into the distance ahead of the observer, employing powerful, rather stiff wingbeats. The call is a wailing whistle, given mainly at night, as with other birds in this family. The great thick-knee eats crabs, large insects, and other animal prey. A single egg is laid in a bare scrape on the open shingle.

== Image gallery ==
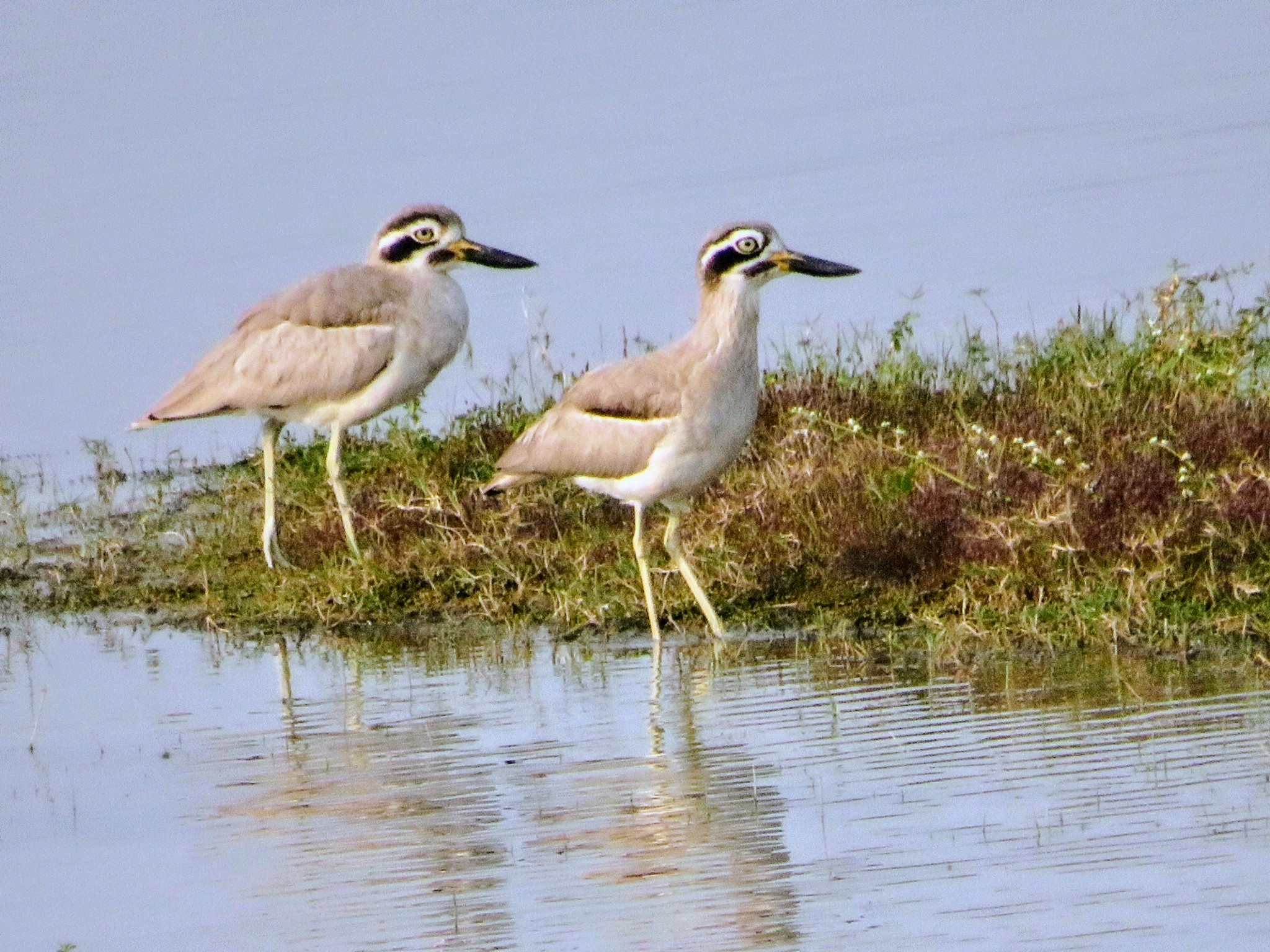
Pair at Jamnagar, Gujarat

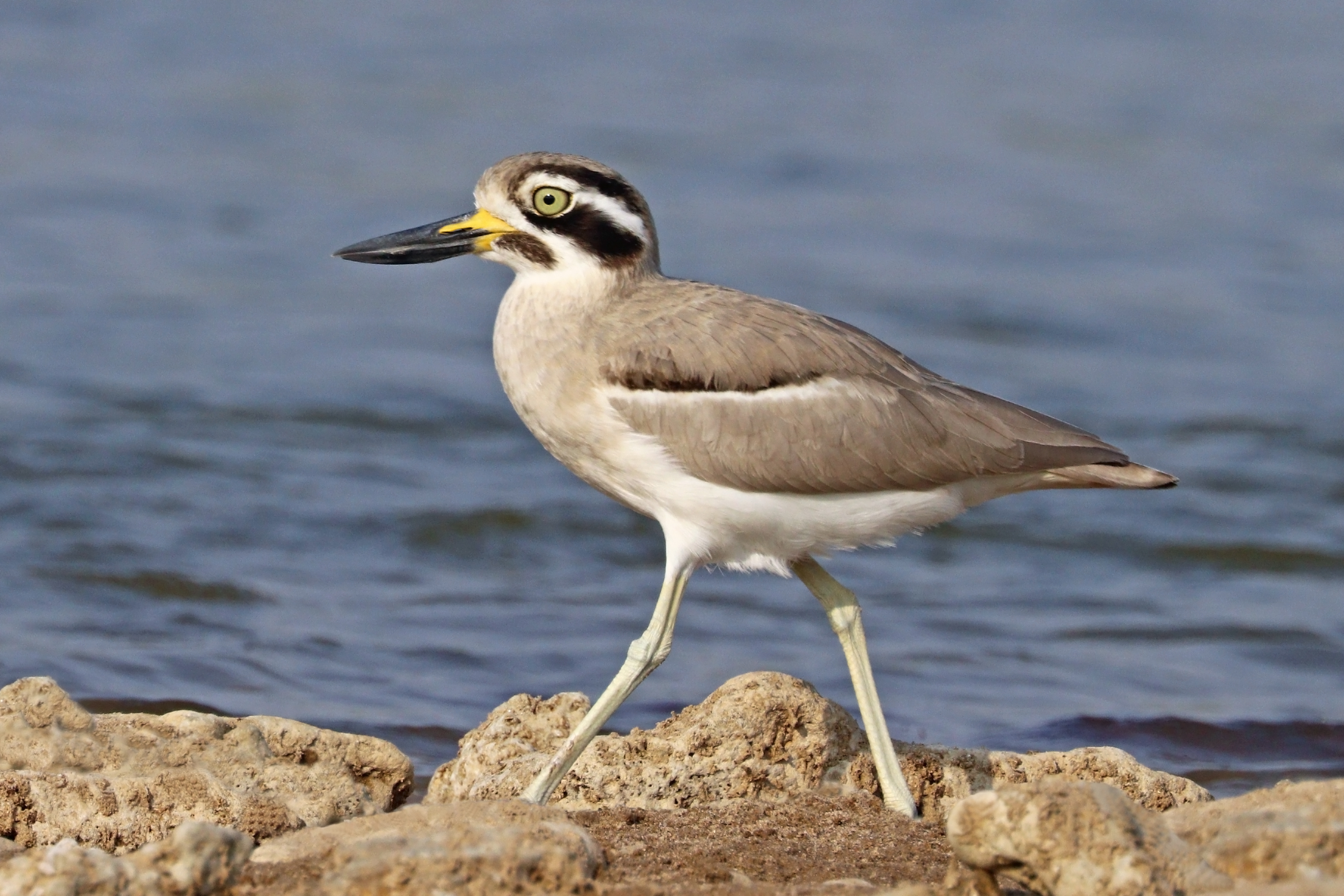
Ambulating along Chambal shore

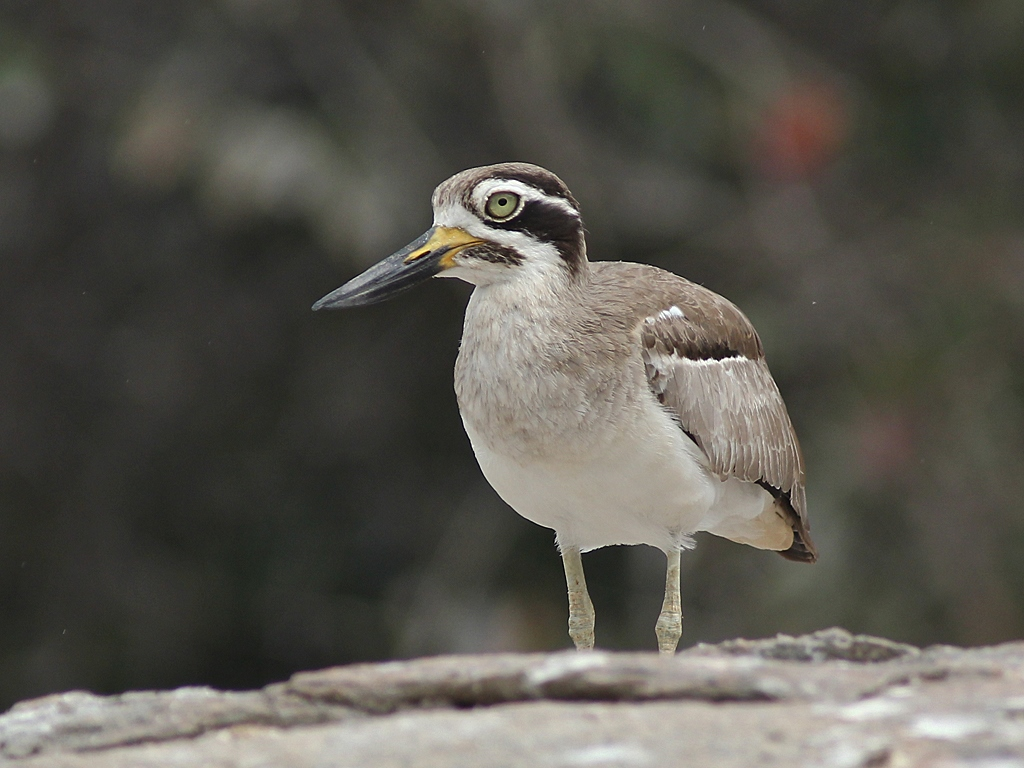
Roosting bird

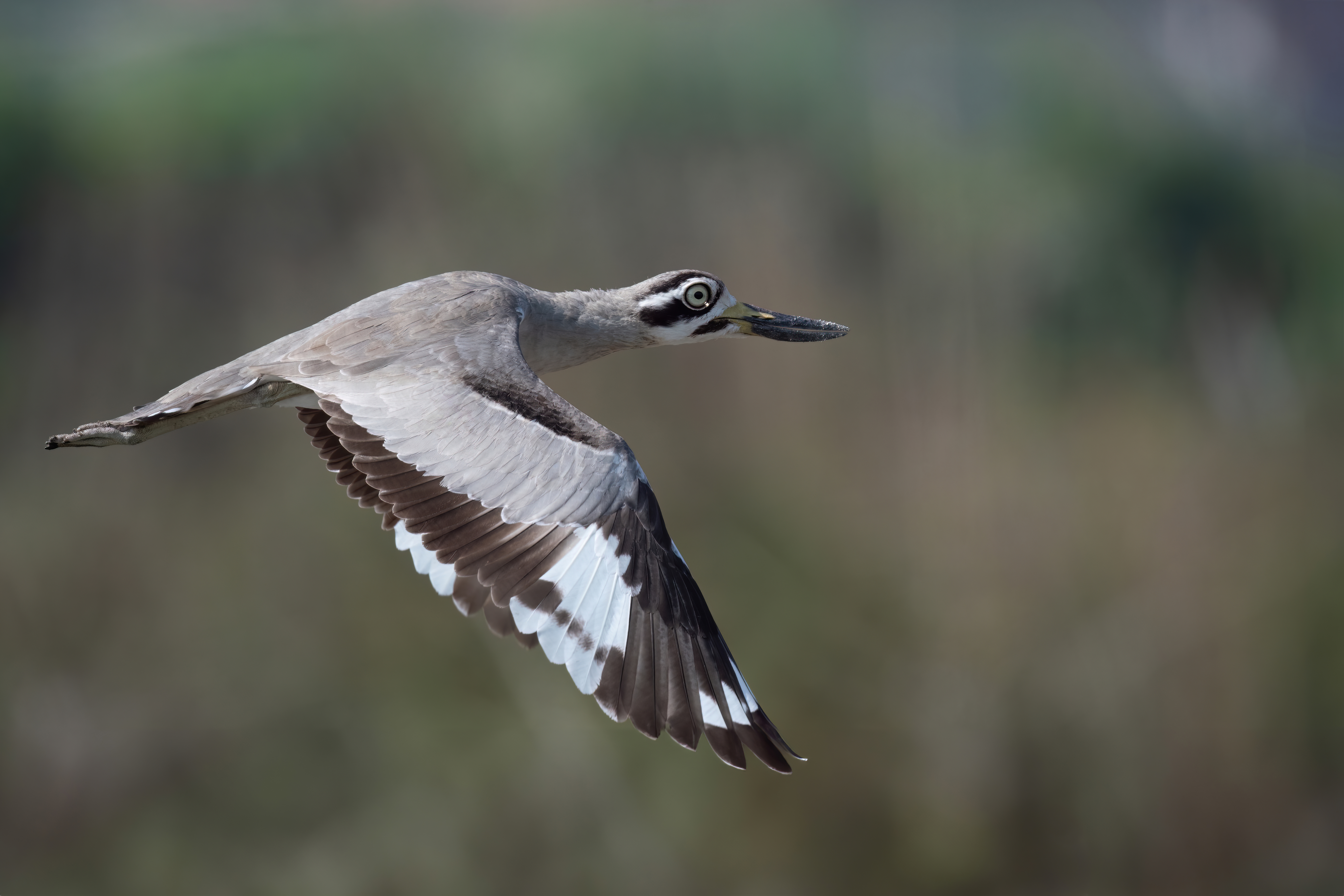
In flight (Kathmandu Valley, Nepal)
