= Ranganathittu Bird Sanctuary =

Bird sanctuary in the Mandya District of Karnataka, India

- IUCN category IV (habitat/species management area)
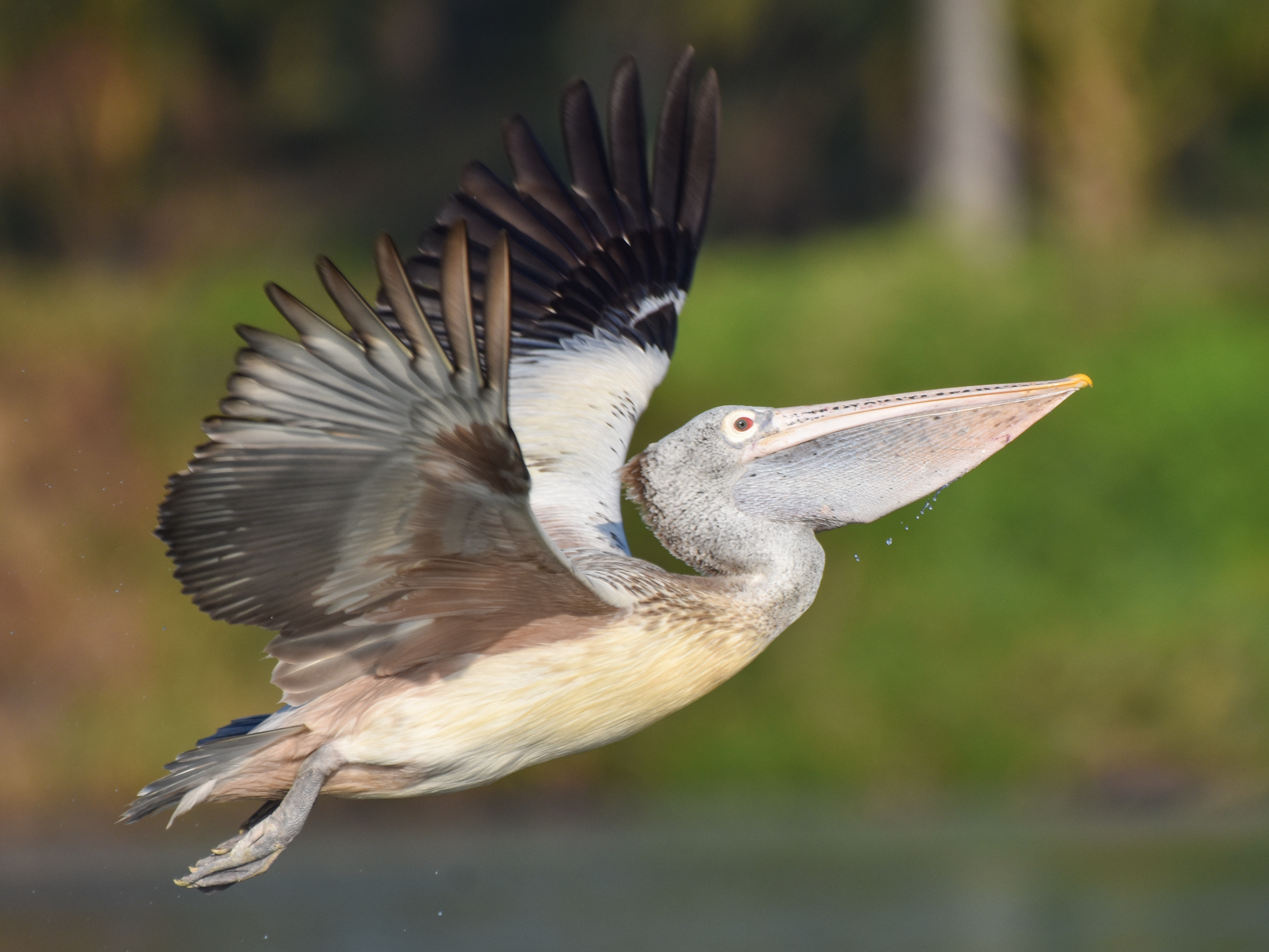
- Spot-billed pelican taking off

- Location within Karnataka Location within India
- Interactive map of Ranganathittu Bird Sanctuary
- Location: Mandya, Karnataka, India
- Coordinates: 12°24′N 76°39′E
- Area: 40 acres (16 ha)
- Established: 1940
- Visitors: 304,000 (in 2016–17)
- Governing body: Ministry of Environment and Forests, Government of India

Ramsar Wetland
- Official name: Ranganathittu Bird Sanctuary
- Designated: 15 February 2022
- Reference no.: 2473

Ranganathittu Bird Sanctuary (also known as Pakshi Kashi of Karnataka), is a bird sanctuary in the Mandya District of Karnataka, in India. It is the largest bird sanctuary in the state, 40 acres (16 ha) in area, and comprises six islets on the banks of the Kaveri river. The sanctuary has been designated on 15 February 2022 as a protected Ramsar site since 2022.

Ranganathittu is located 3 km (1.9 mi) from the historic town of Srirangapattana, and 16 km (9.9 mi) north of Mysore. The sanctuary attracted about 3 lakh visitors during 2016–17.

== History ==
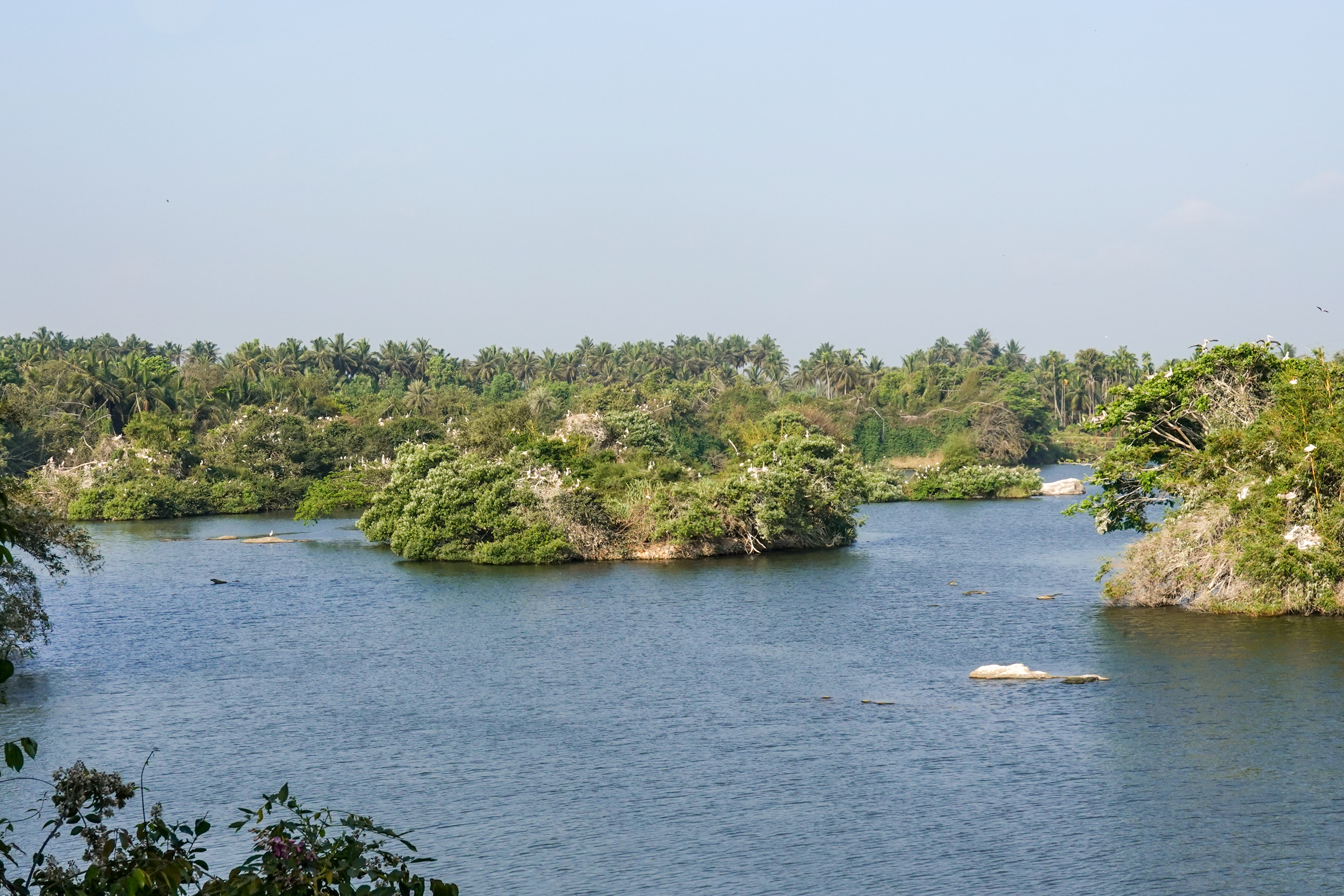
Islets in the Kaveri at Ranganathittu

Ranganathittu's islets were formed when an embankment across the Kaveri river was built between 1645 and 1648 by the then king of Mysore, Kanteerava Narasimharaja Wadiyar. These islets, originally numbering 25, soon started attracting birds. The ornithologist Salim Ali observed that the islets formed an important nesting ground for a large variety of birds, and persuaded the king of Mysore to declare the area a protected area in 1940. The sanctuary is currently maintained by the Forest Department of Karnataka and efforts are ongoing to improve the sanctuary, including purchasing nearby private land to expand the protected area. In 2014, around 28 square km around the sanctuary was declared as an eco-sensitive zone, meaning that certain commercial activities cannot take place without the government's permission.

== Flooding ==
The sanctuary with its islets experience heavy flooding during certain rainy seasons when water is released from Krishna Raja Sagara dam upstream, due to heavy rains. During heavy flooding, boating is suspended and tourists are allowed to watch the nesting birds from a distance. Frequent flooding has also damaged some portions of three islands over the past few decades.

== Biome ==
Most of the park is within a riparian area.

== Flora ==
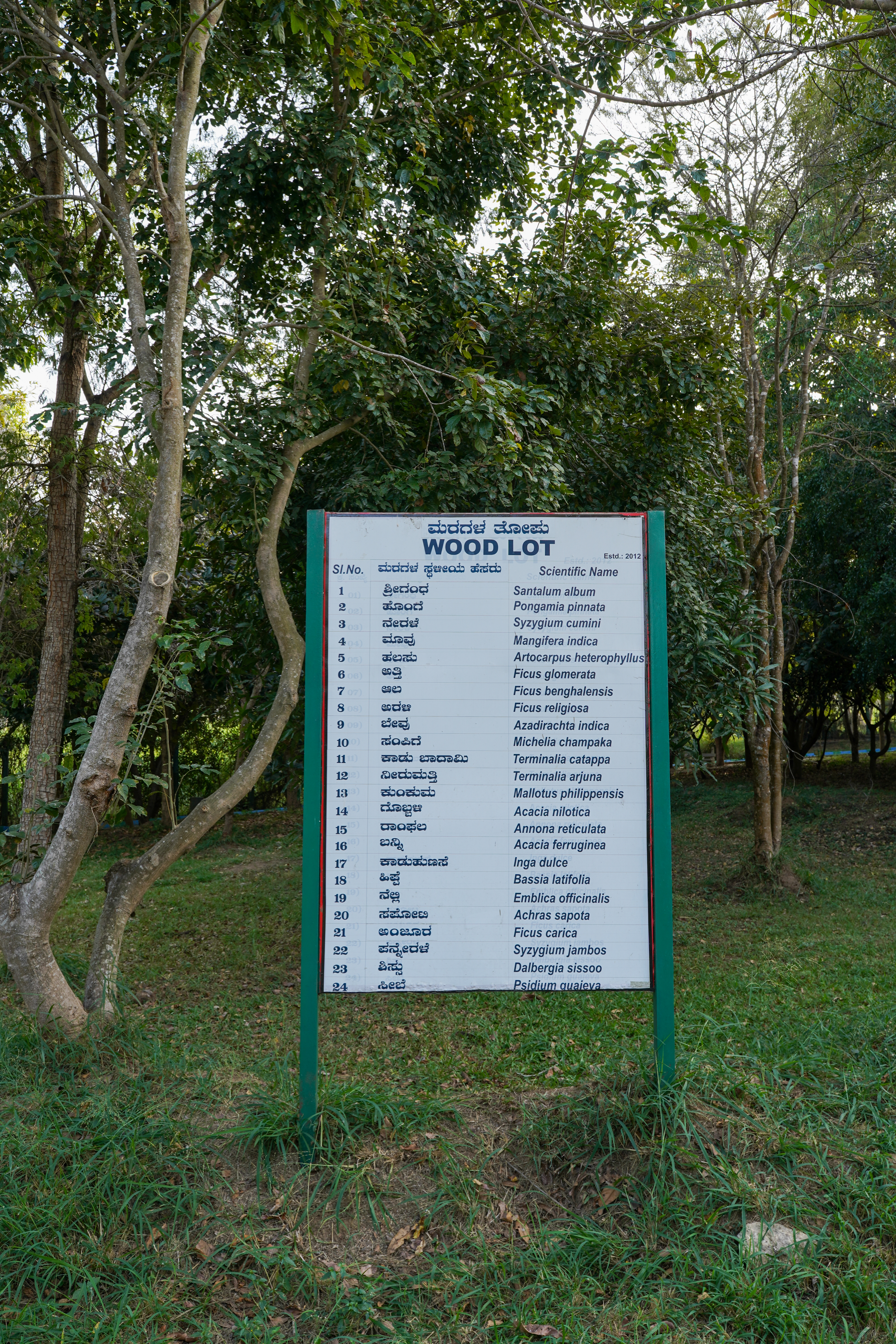
List of trees in a copse

Riverine reed beds cover the banks of the islands, while the islands themselves are covered in broadleaf forests, with dominant species being Terminalia arjuna (Arjun tree), bamboo groves, and Pandanus trees. Eucalyptus and acacia trees have also been planted, which might lead to long-term eradication of native species. The endemic and threatened lily Iphigenia mysorensis of the family Colchicaceae also grows in the sanctuary.

== Fauna ==
=== Birds ===
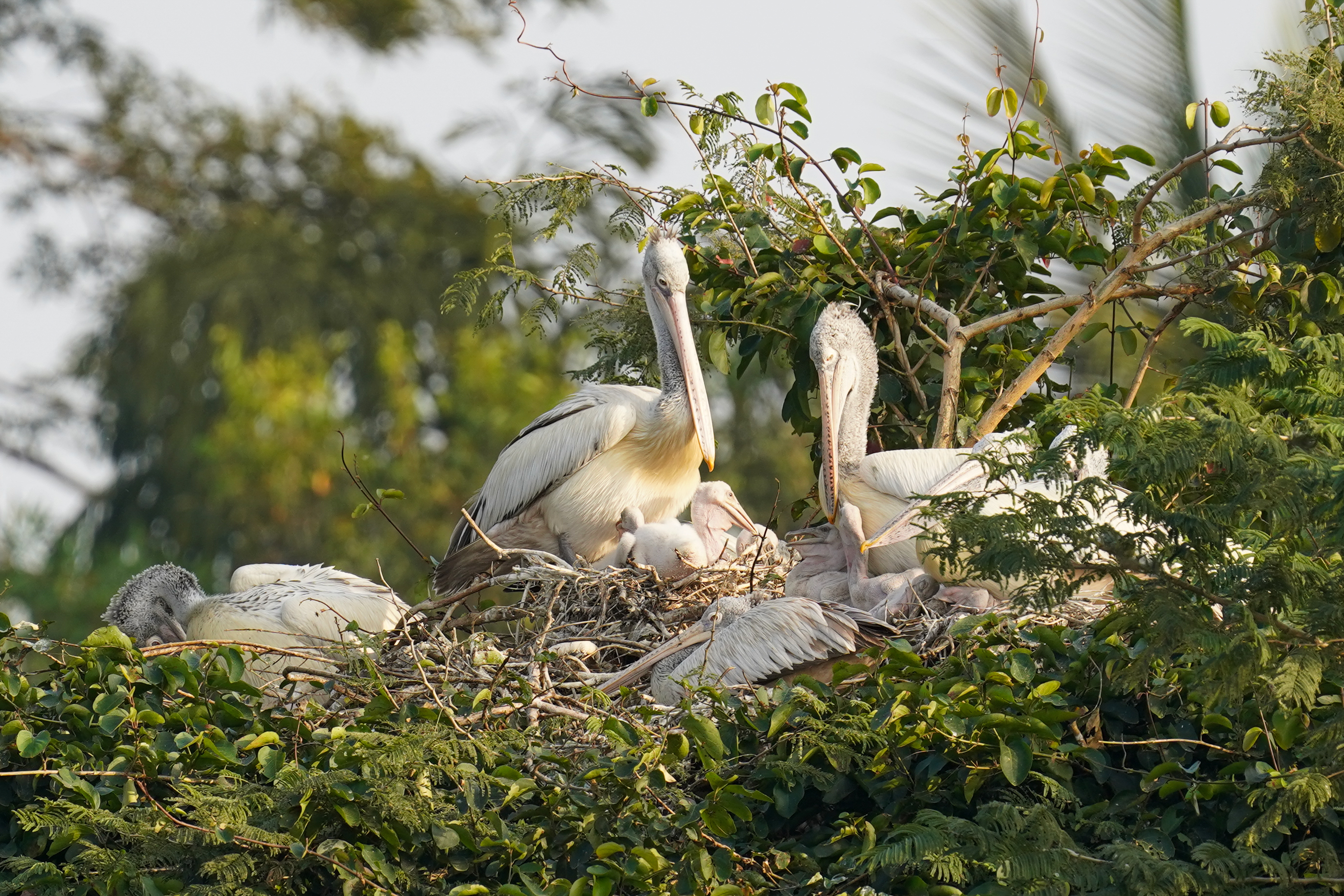
Spot-billed pelicans with chick in nest

Roughly 170 bird species have been recorded. Of these, the painted stork, Asian openbill stork, common spoonbill, woolly-necked stork, black-headed ibis, lesser whistling duck, Indian shag, stork-billed kingfisher, egret, cormorant, Oriental darter, spot-billed pelican and heron breed at Ranganathittu regularly. The great stone plover, and river tern also nest there, while the park is also home to a large flock of streak-throated swallows. Ranganathittu is a popular nesting site and about 8,000 nestlings were sighted during June 2011. About 50 pelicans have made Ranganathittu their permanent home.

During winter months, starting from mid-December, as many as 40,000 birds congregate at Ranganathittu, some migrating from Siberia, Latin America and parts of north India. During January and February, more than 30 species of migratory birds can be found in the sanctuary.

=== Mammals and reptiles ===
The islands are host to numerous small mammals including bonnet macaque, smooth coated otter, colonies of flying fox and common small mammals such as common palm civet and Indian gray mongoose. Additionally, there is a population of monitor lizards. The mugger crocodile or marsh crocodile is a common inhabitant of the riverine reed beds and Ranganathittu has largest fresh water crocodile population in Karnataka state.

== Activities ==
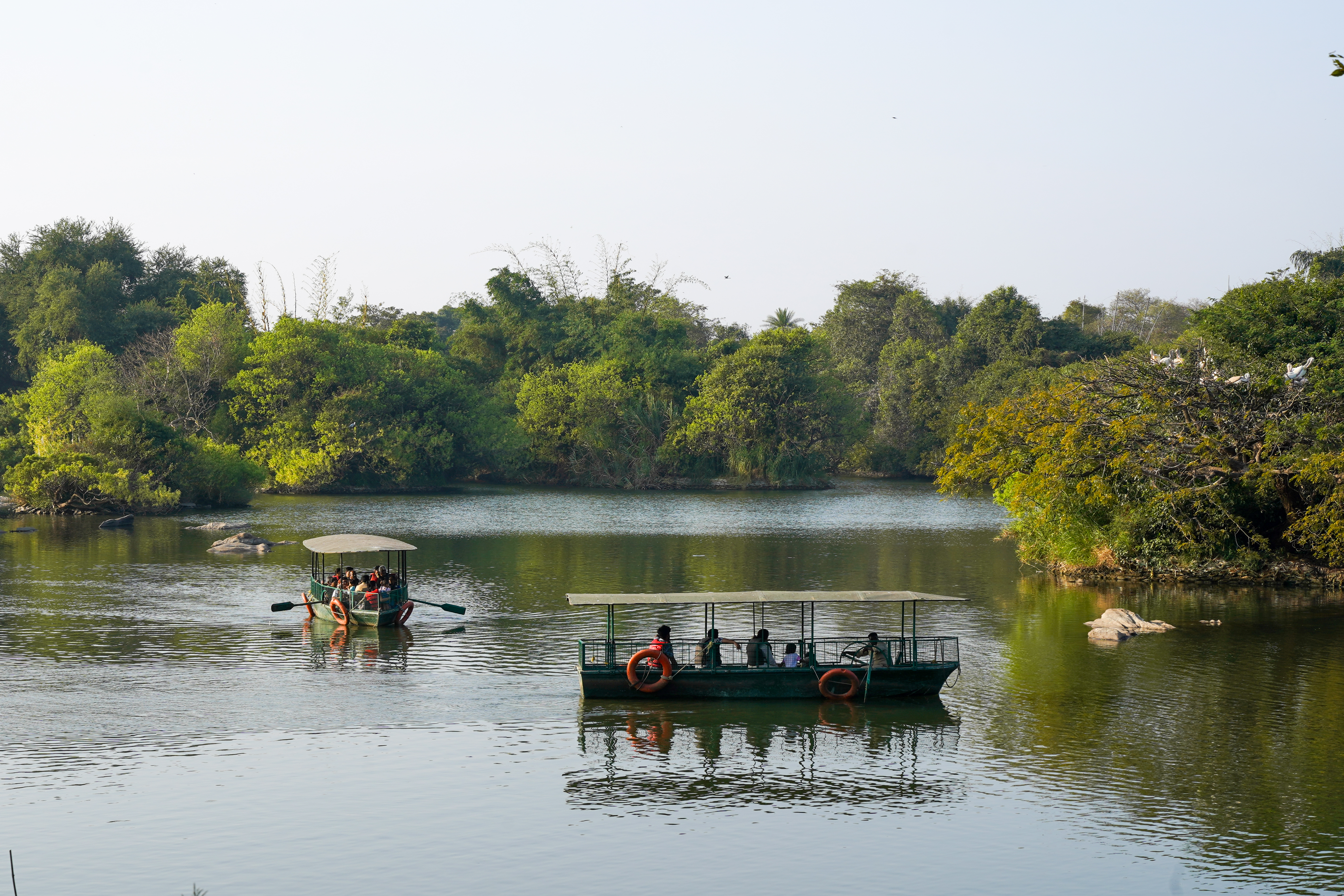
Tourists in a guided tour in a row-boat

Ranger-guided boat tours of the isles are available throughout the day, and are a good way to watch birds, crocodiles, otters, and bats. There is no lodging within the sanctuary, so visitors typically stay over at Mysuru or Srirangapatna. The seasons for visiting the park are June–November (during the nesting season of the water birds). The best time to watch migratory birds is usually December but it can vary year to year.

The Salim Ali Interpretation Centre, maintained by Forest Department, screens a 4- minute documentary to special interest groups.

== Accessibility ==
- Nearest Town: Srirangapatna (3 km)
- Nearest City: Mysuru (19 km)
- Nearest Railhead: Srirangapatna
- Nearest Airport: Mysore Airport (25 km)
- Nearest Highway: Bangalore – Mysuru highway (2 km)

== Gallery ==
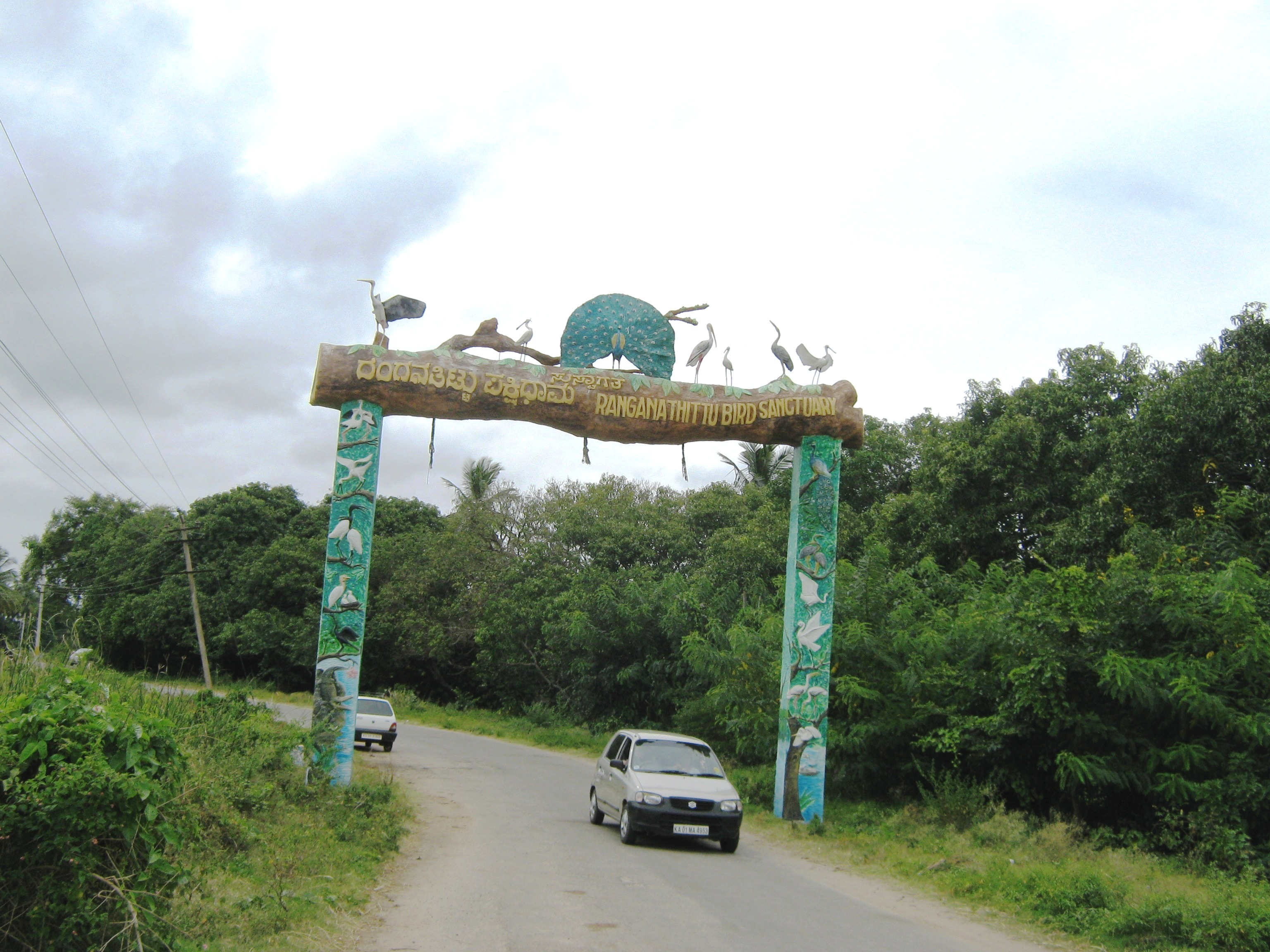
Road entrance to the sanctuary

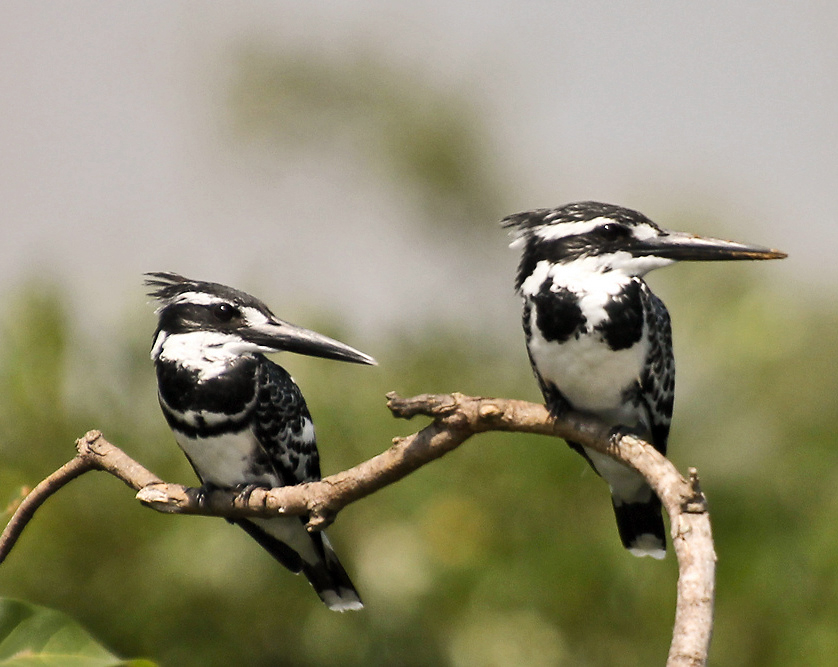
Pied kingfishers

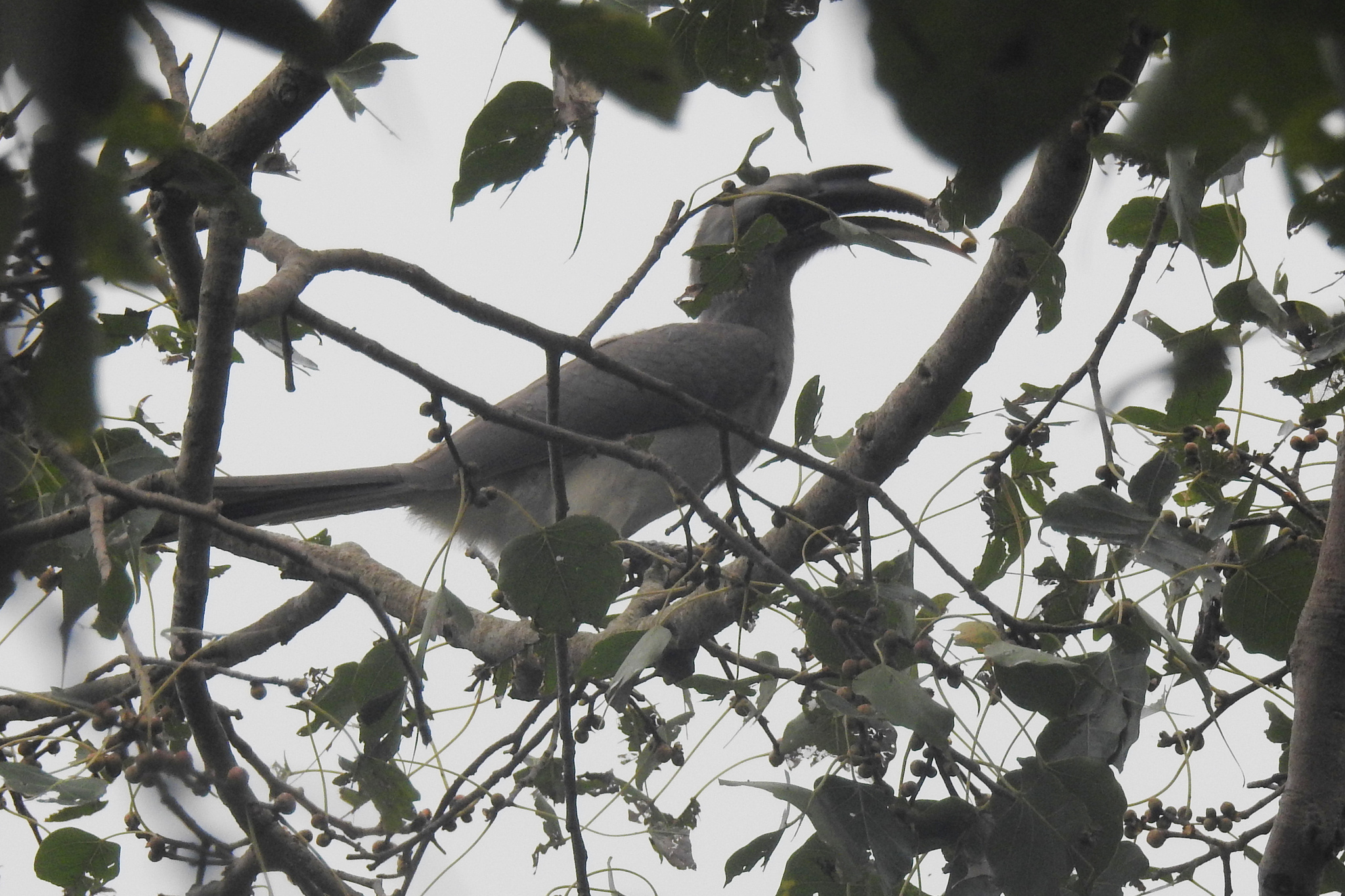
Indian Grey Hornbill feeding on fig.

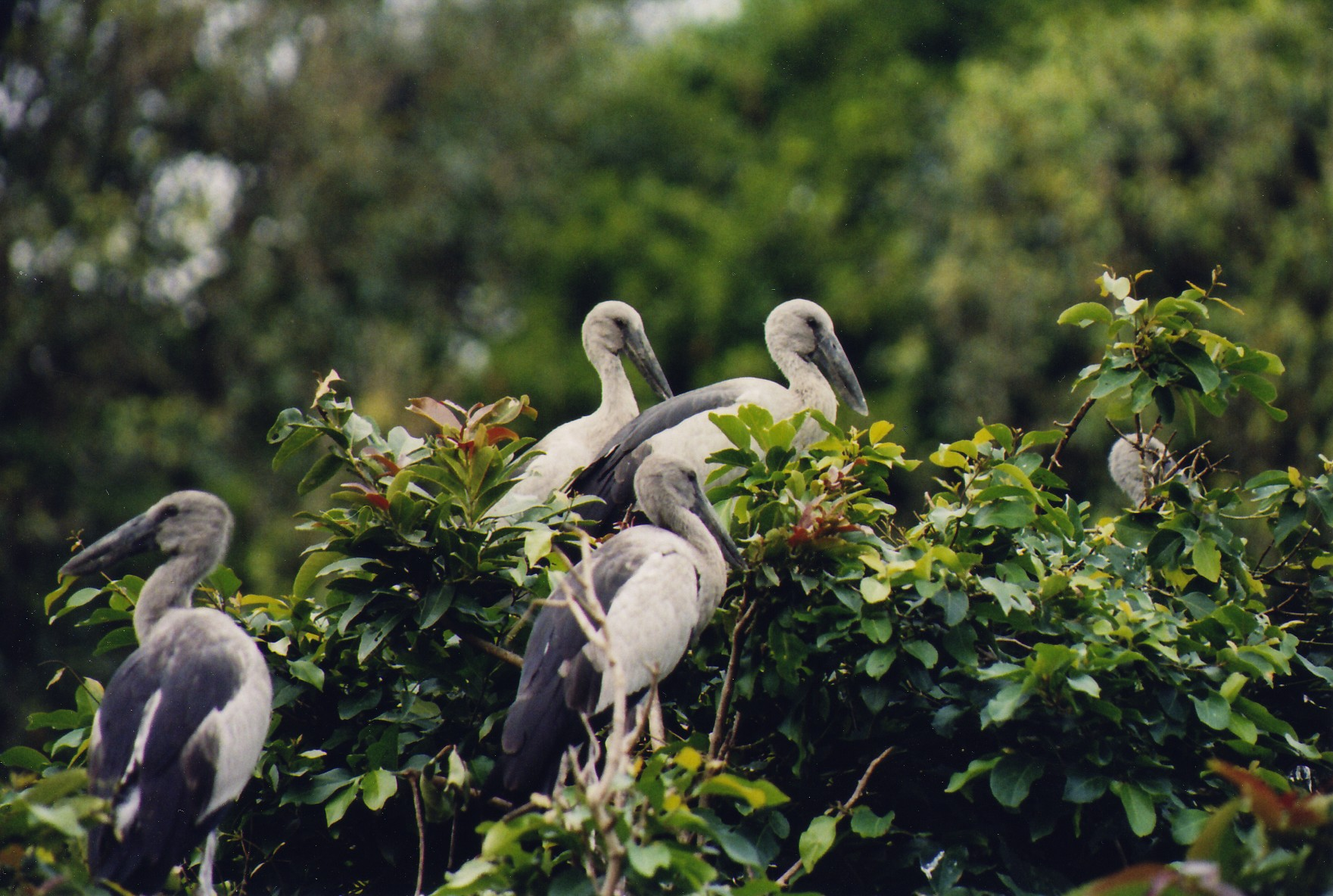
Open-billed storks

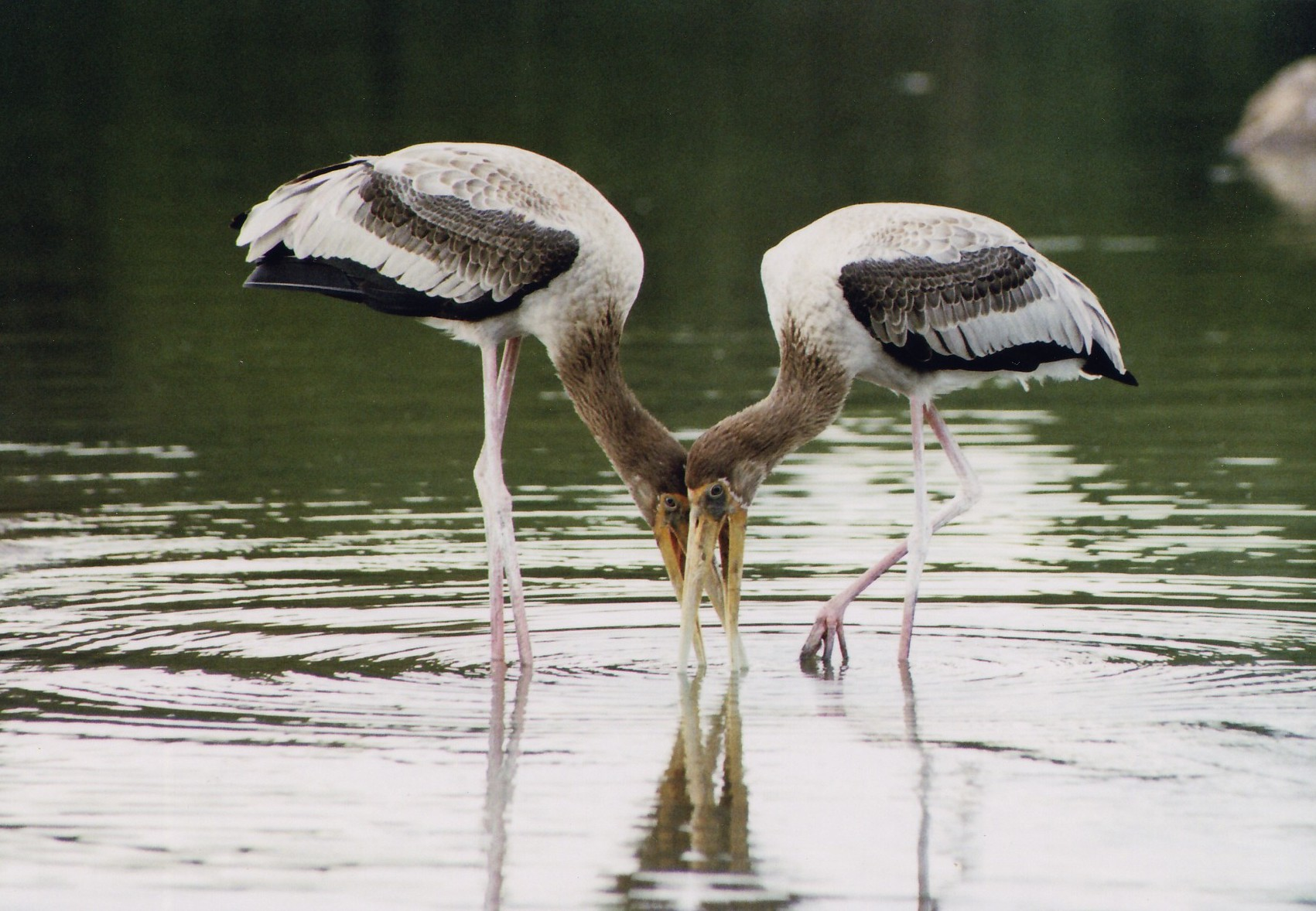
Meal partners, painted storks aiding each other

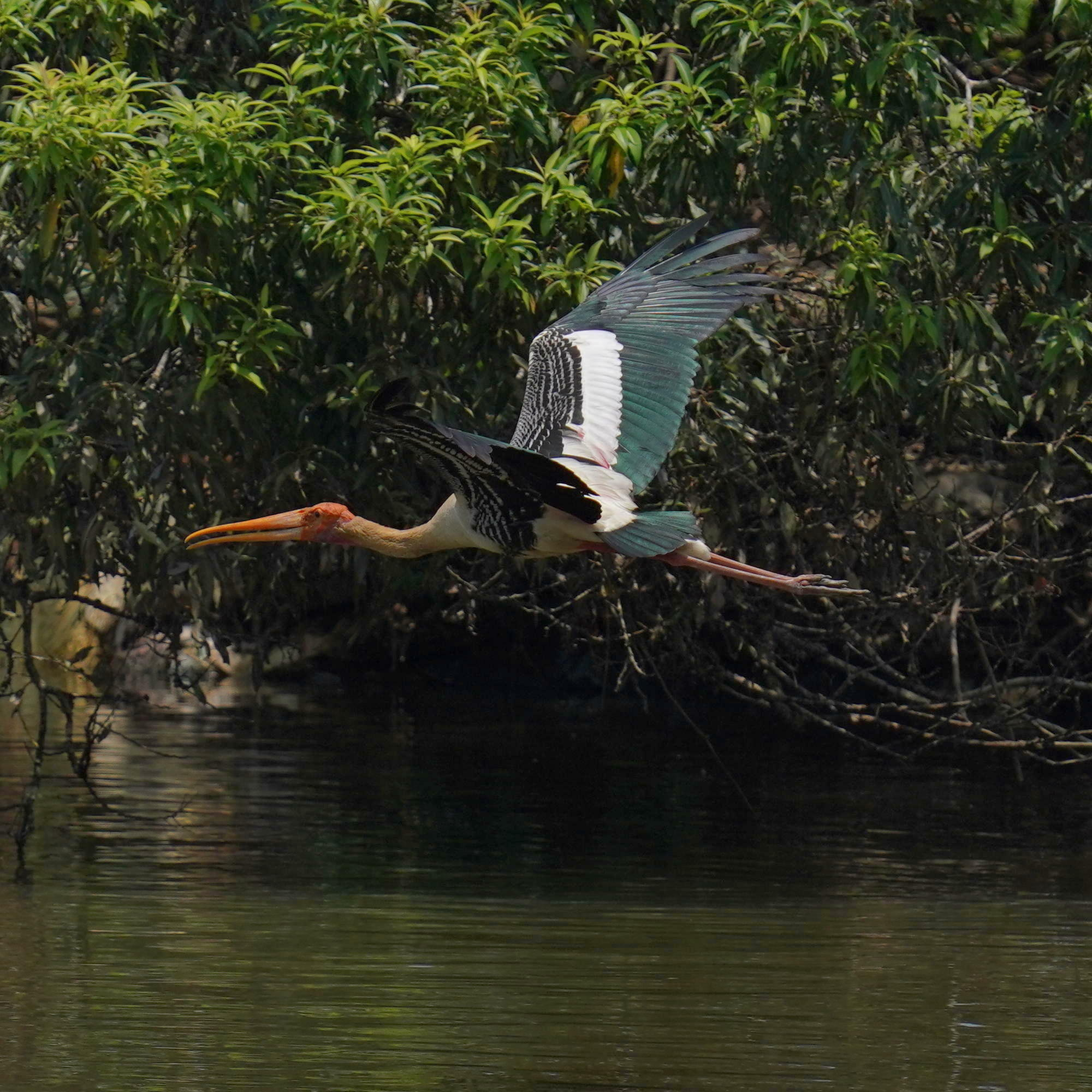
Painted Stork taking flight

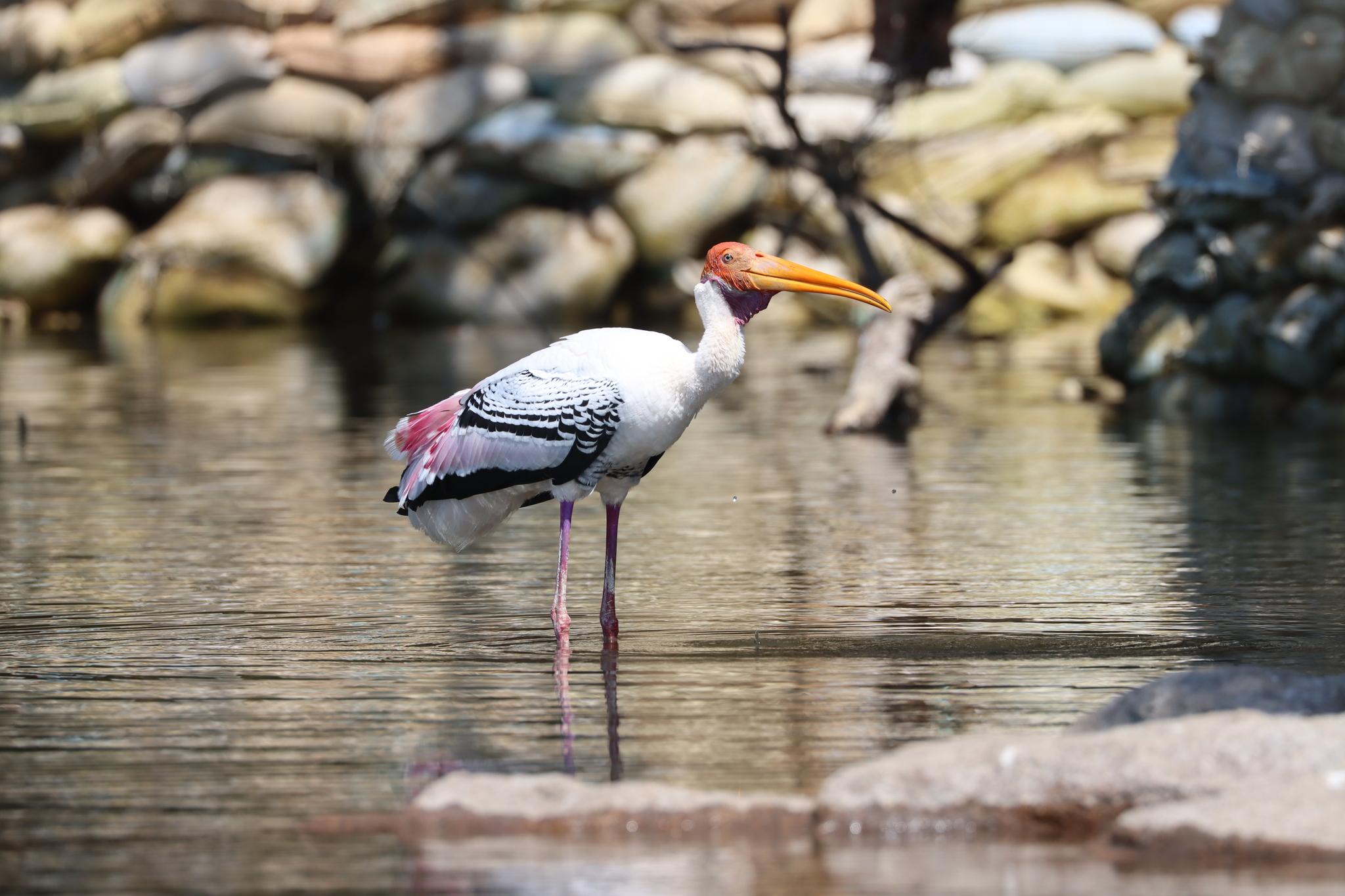
Painted stork searching for food

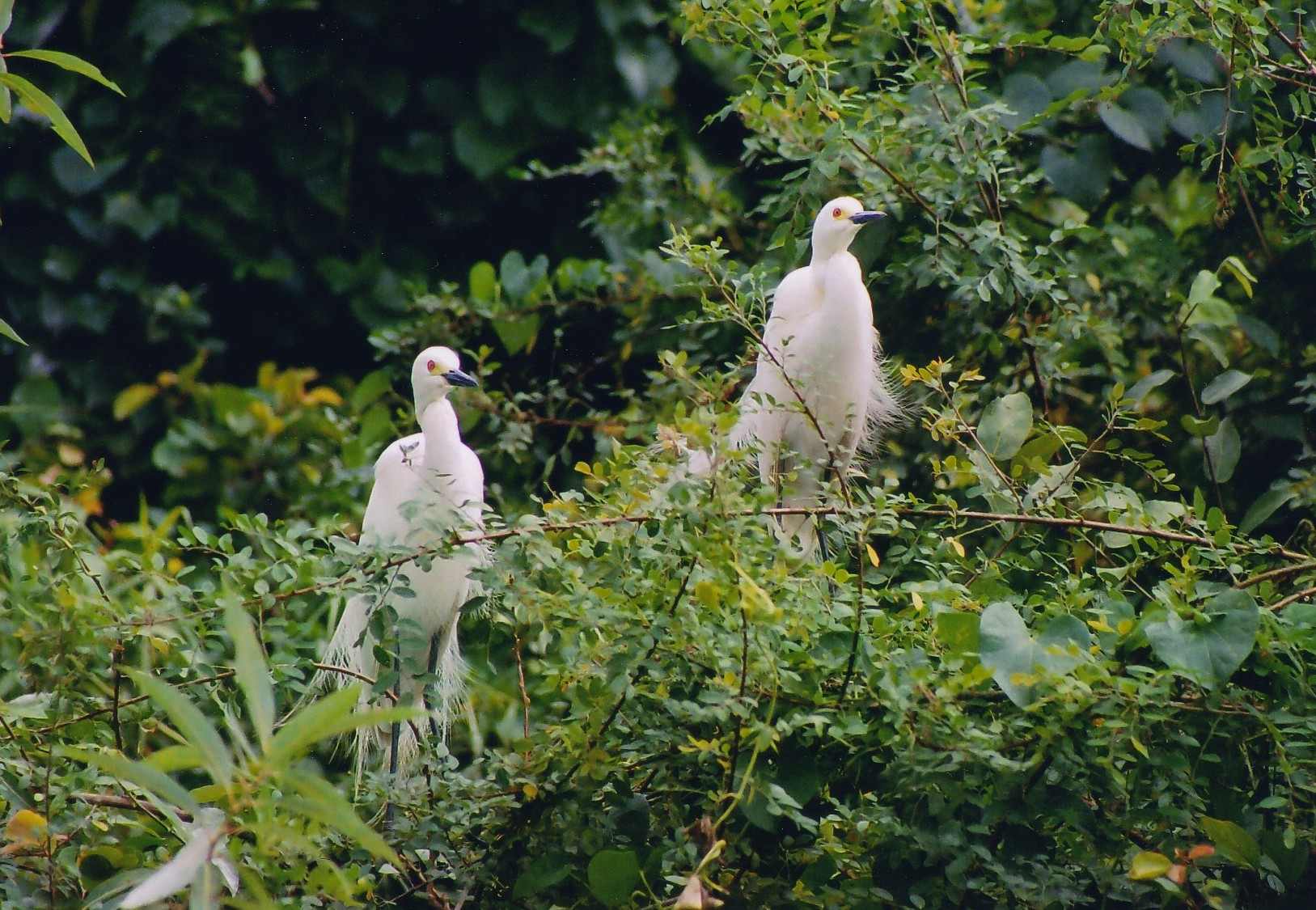
Snowy egret pair

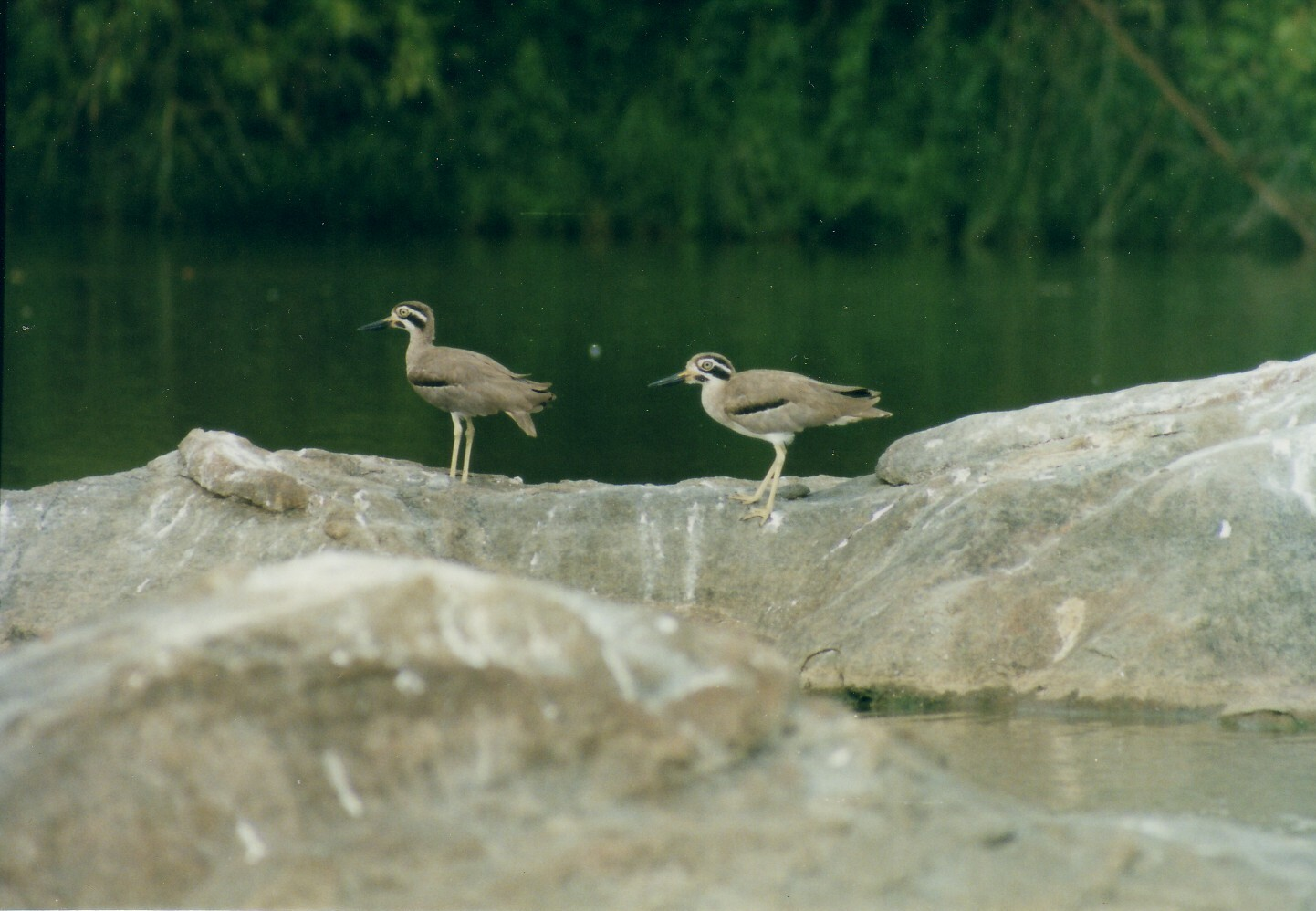
Pair of great stone-curlews

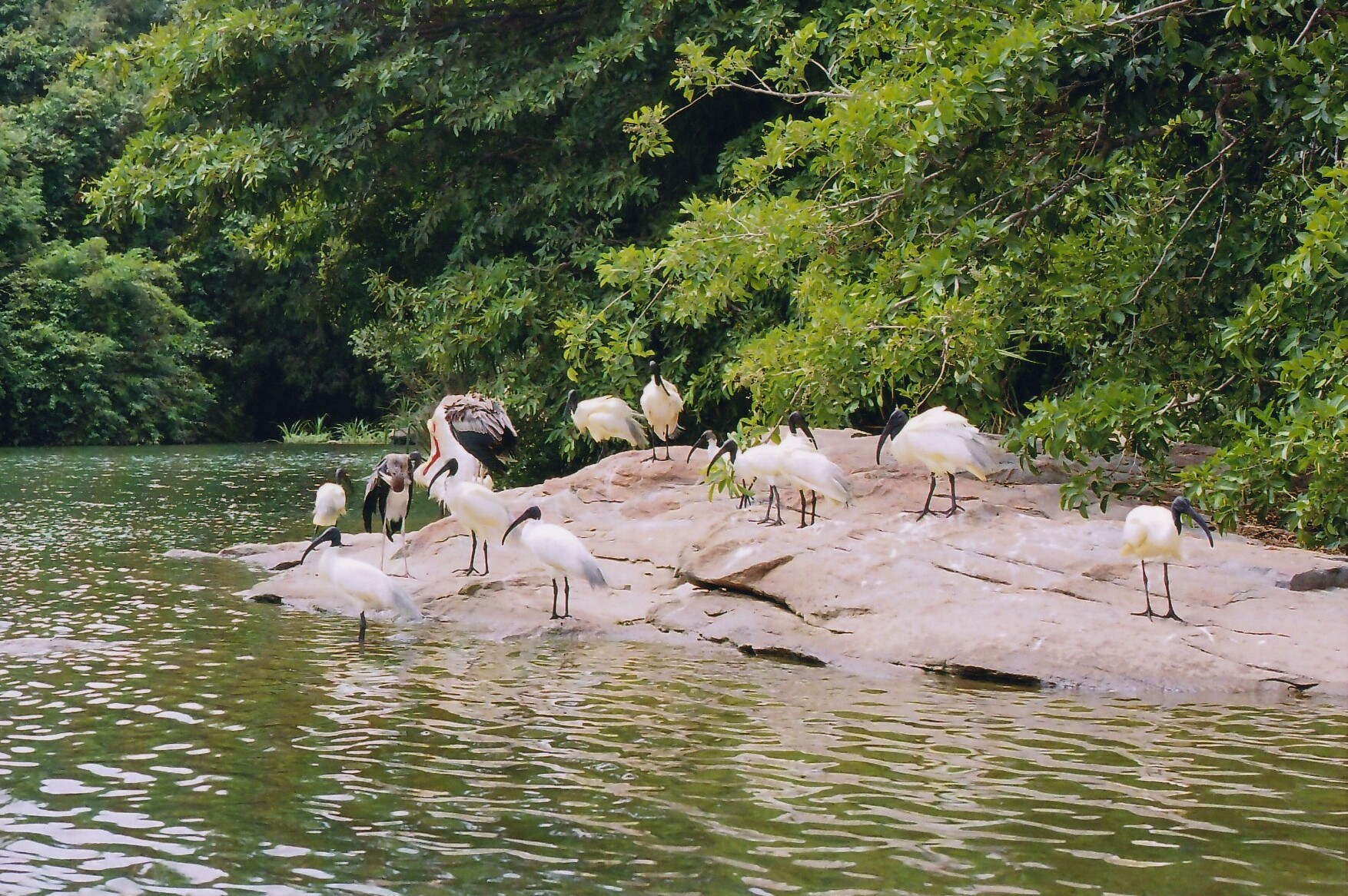
Troop of white ibises

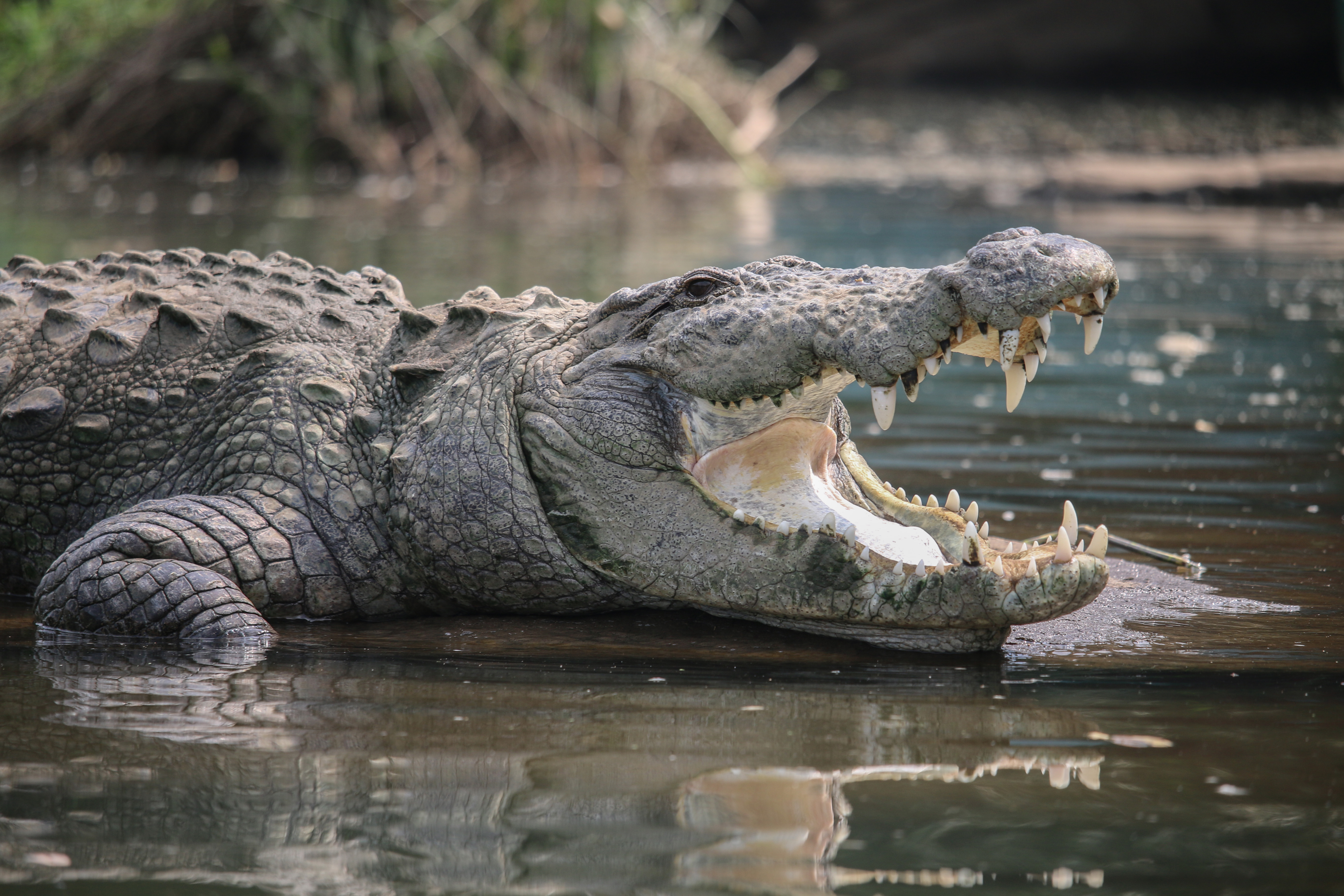
Crocodile basking

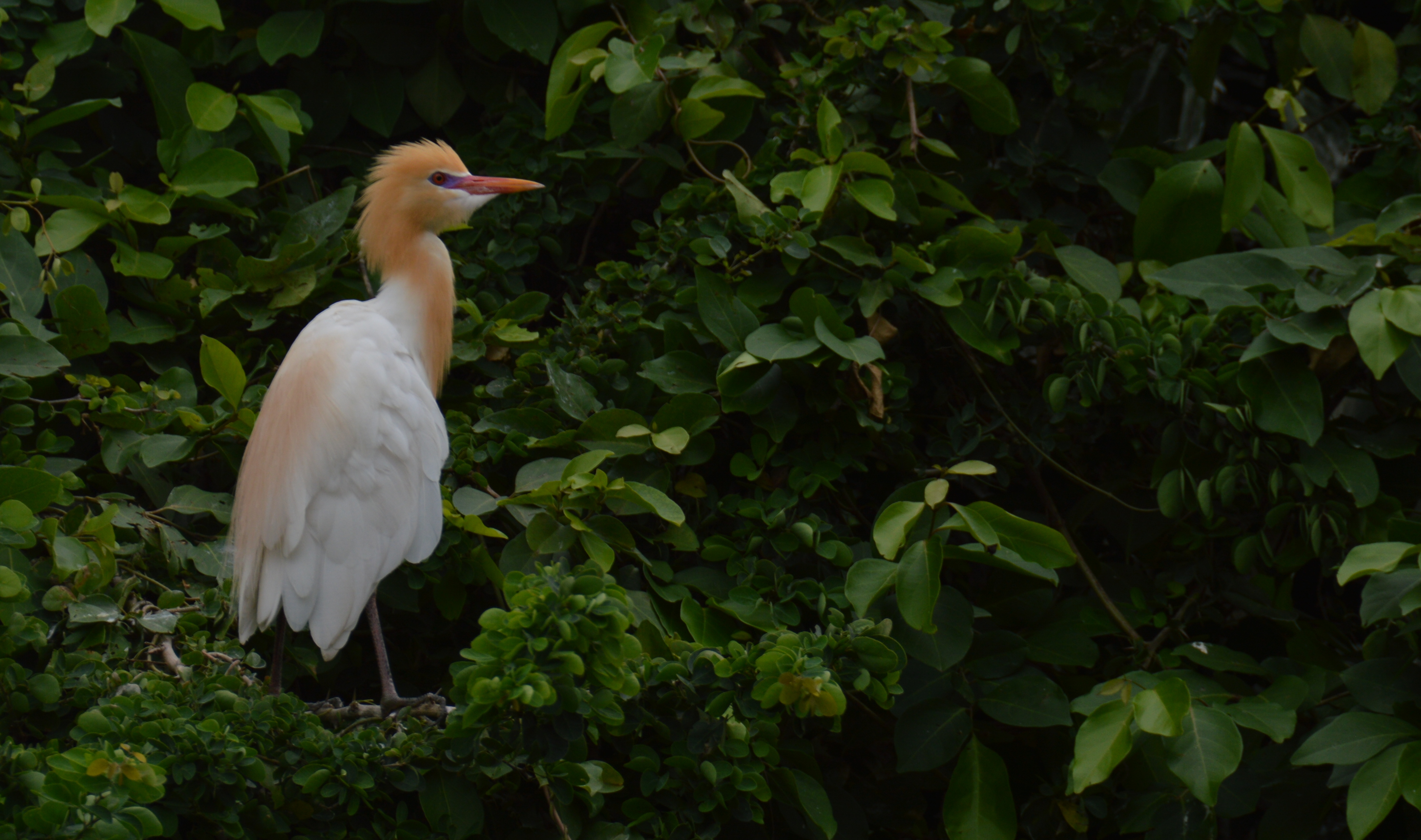
Cattle egret in breeding plumage

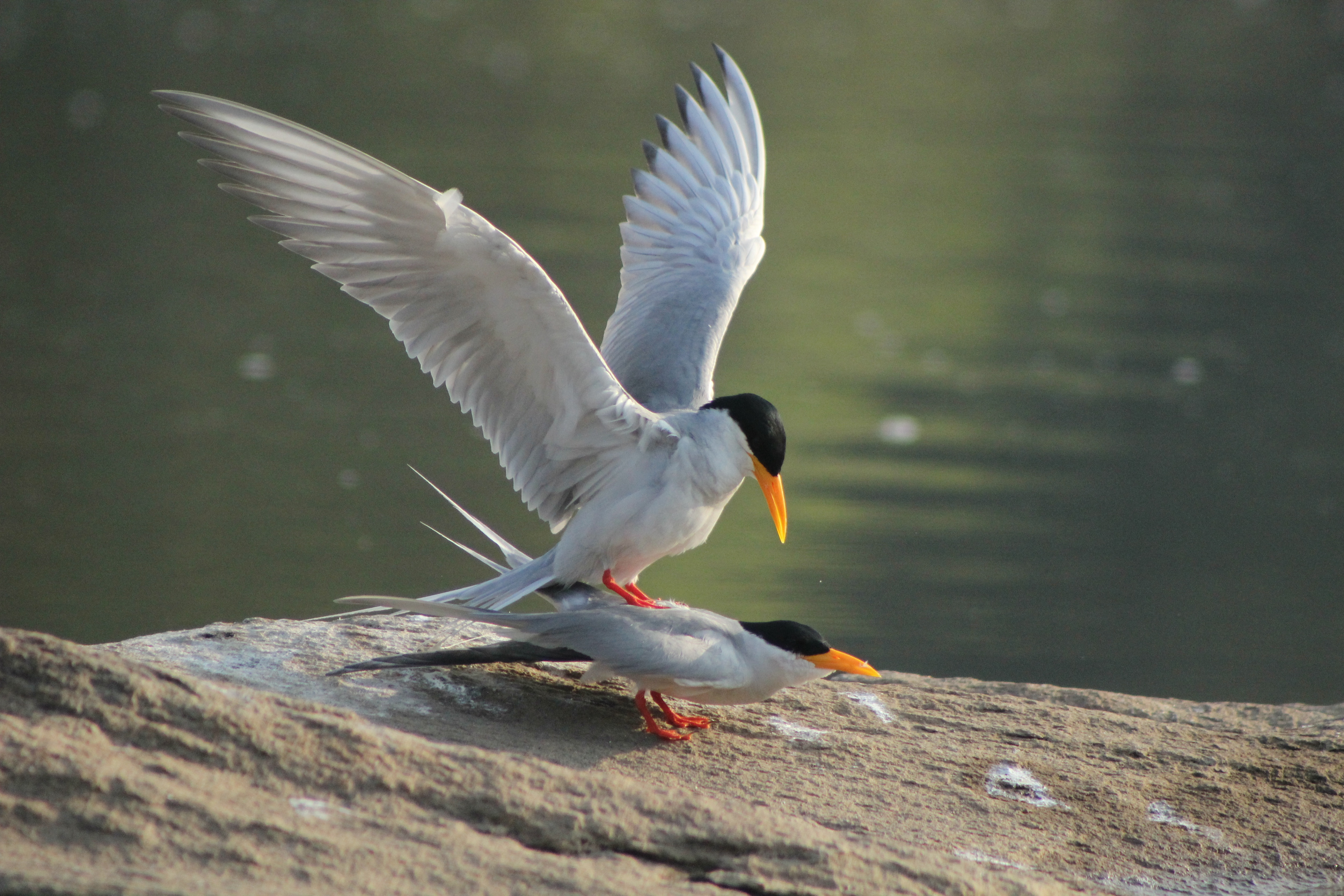
River Terns mating

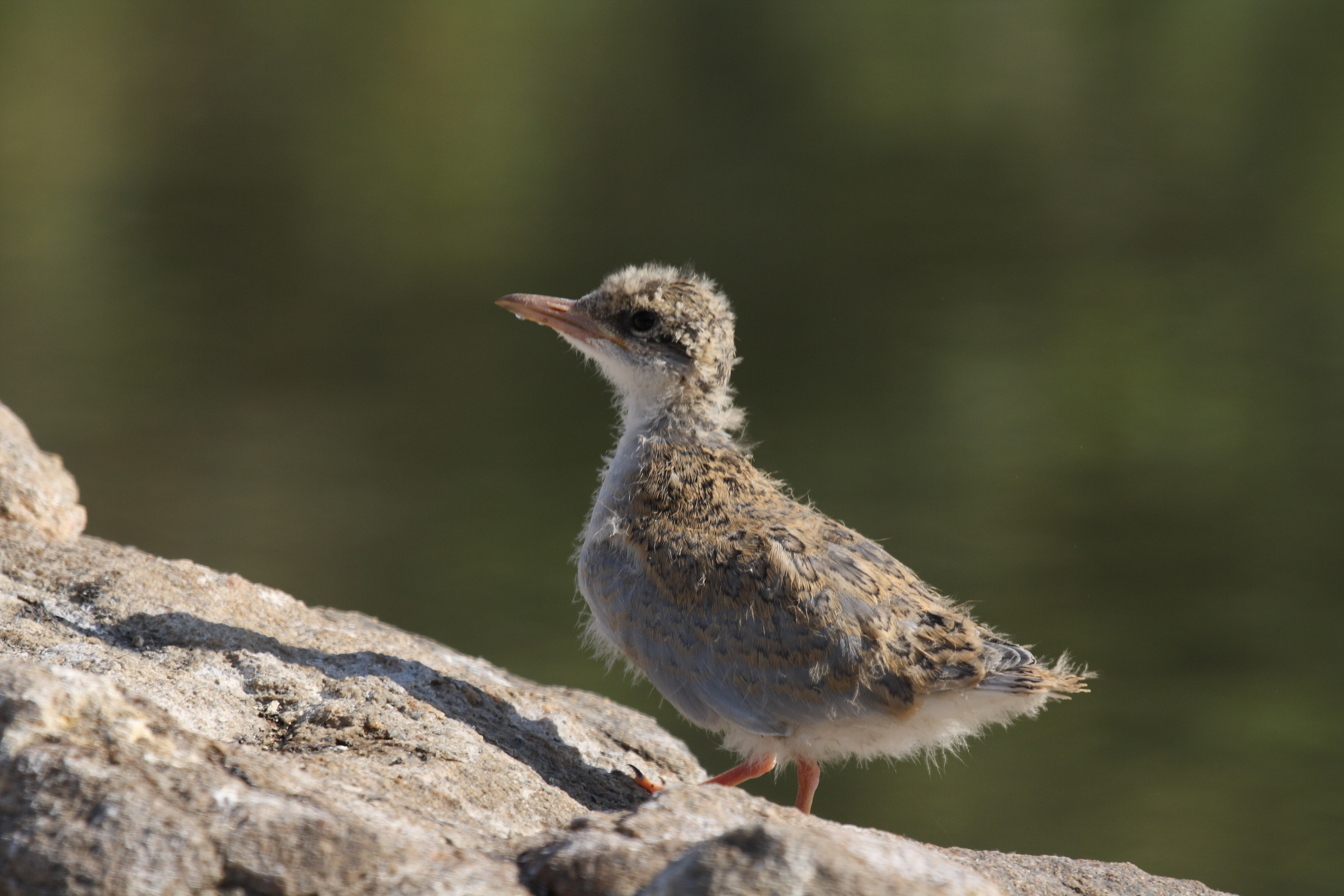
River Tern chick

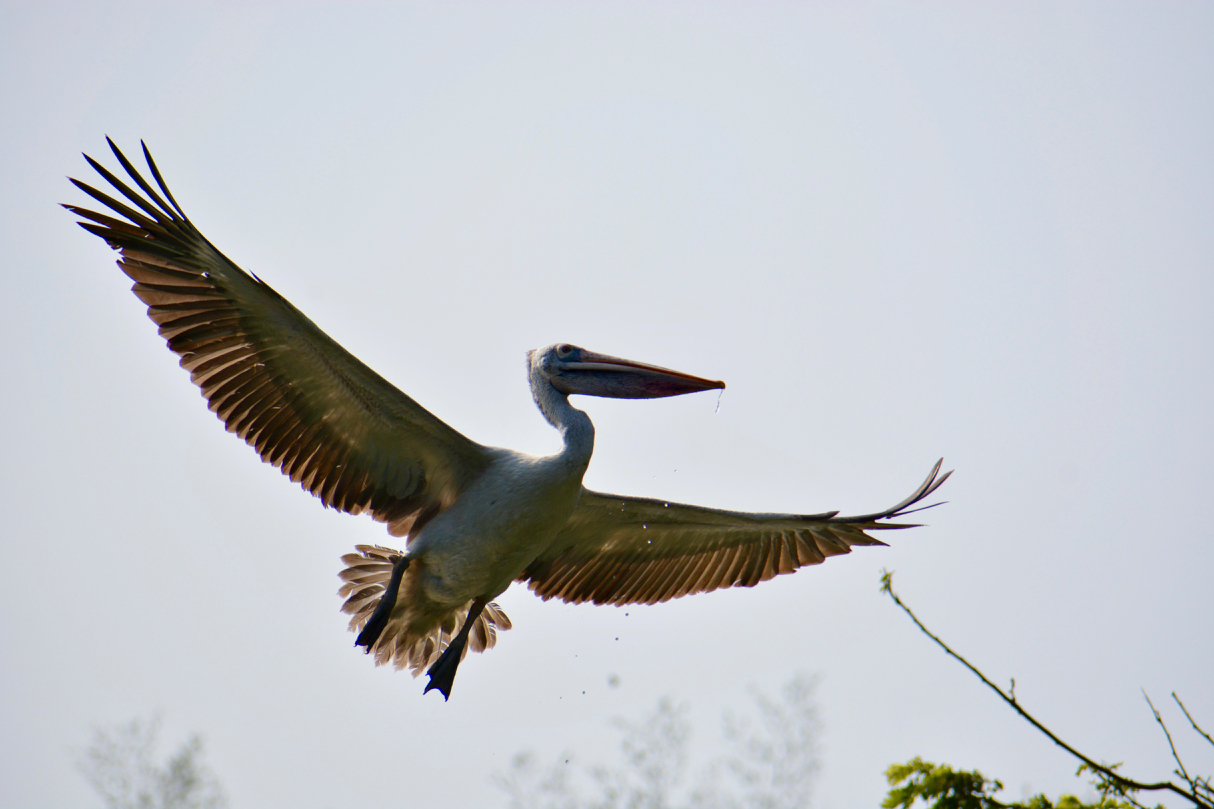
Spot-billed pelican taking flight

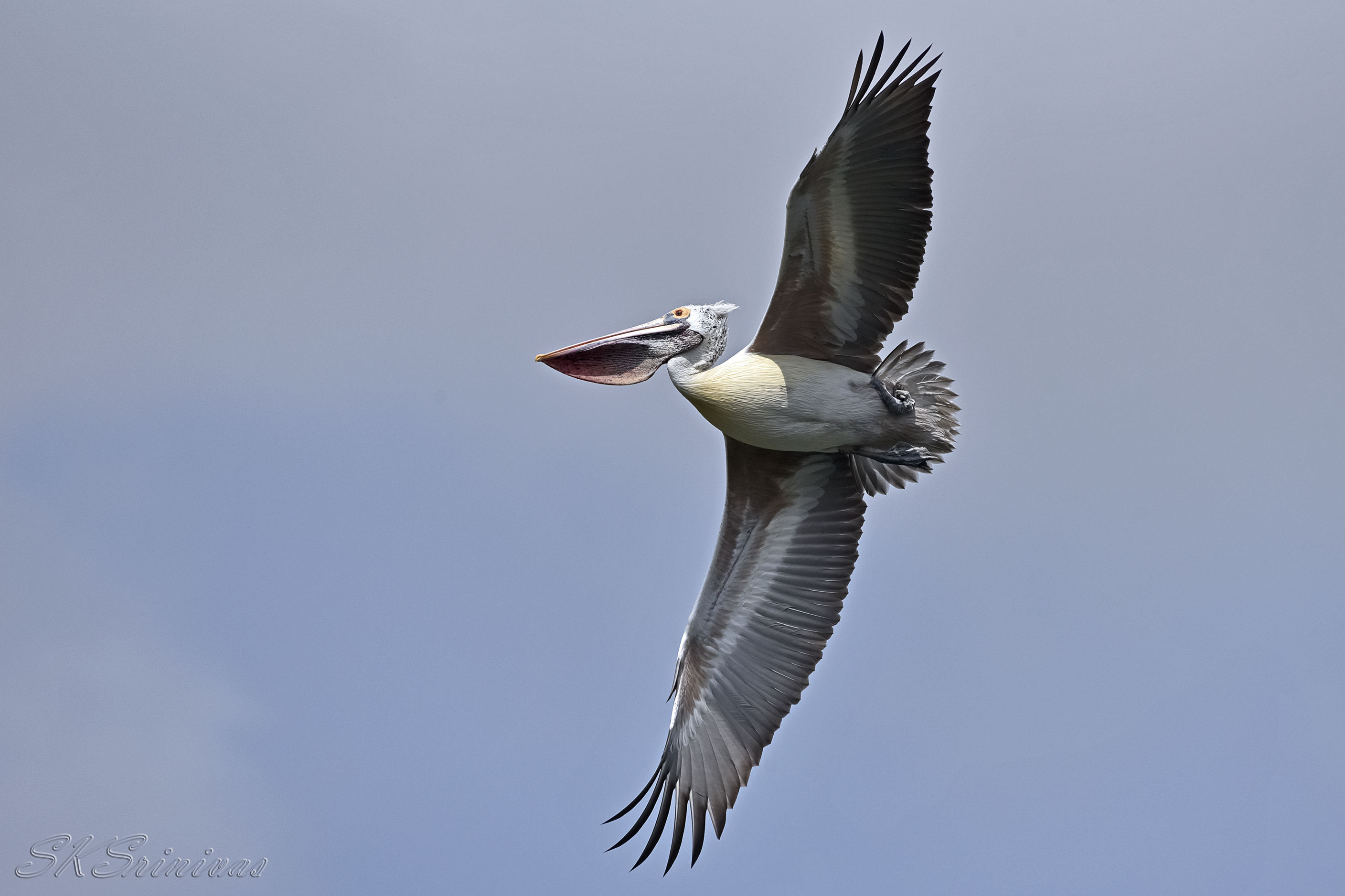
Spot-billed pelican in flight

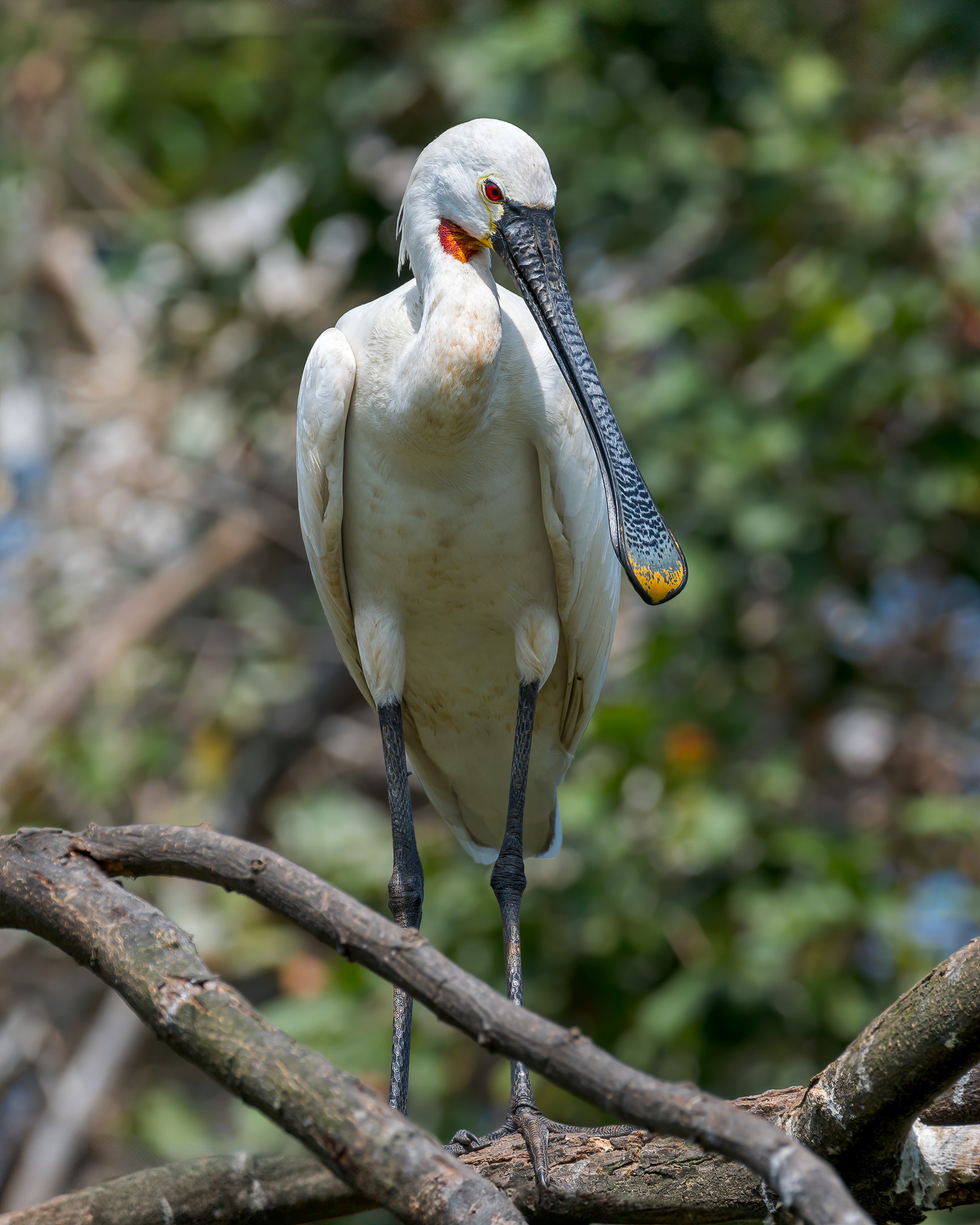
Eurasian Spoonbill

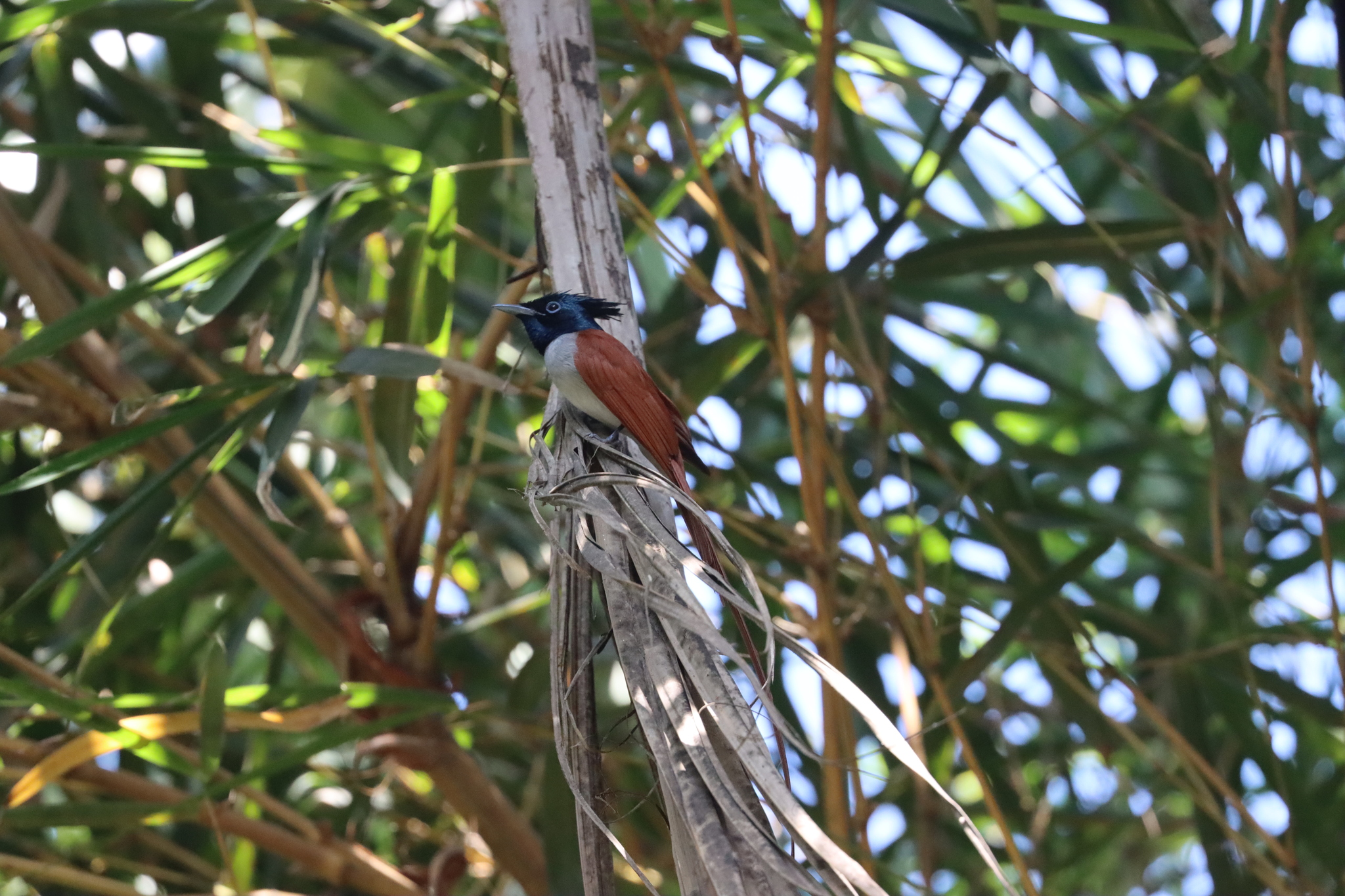
Indian Paradise-Flycatcher

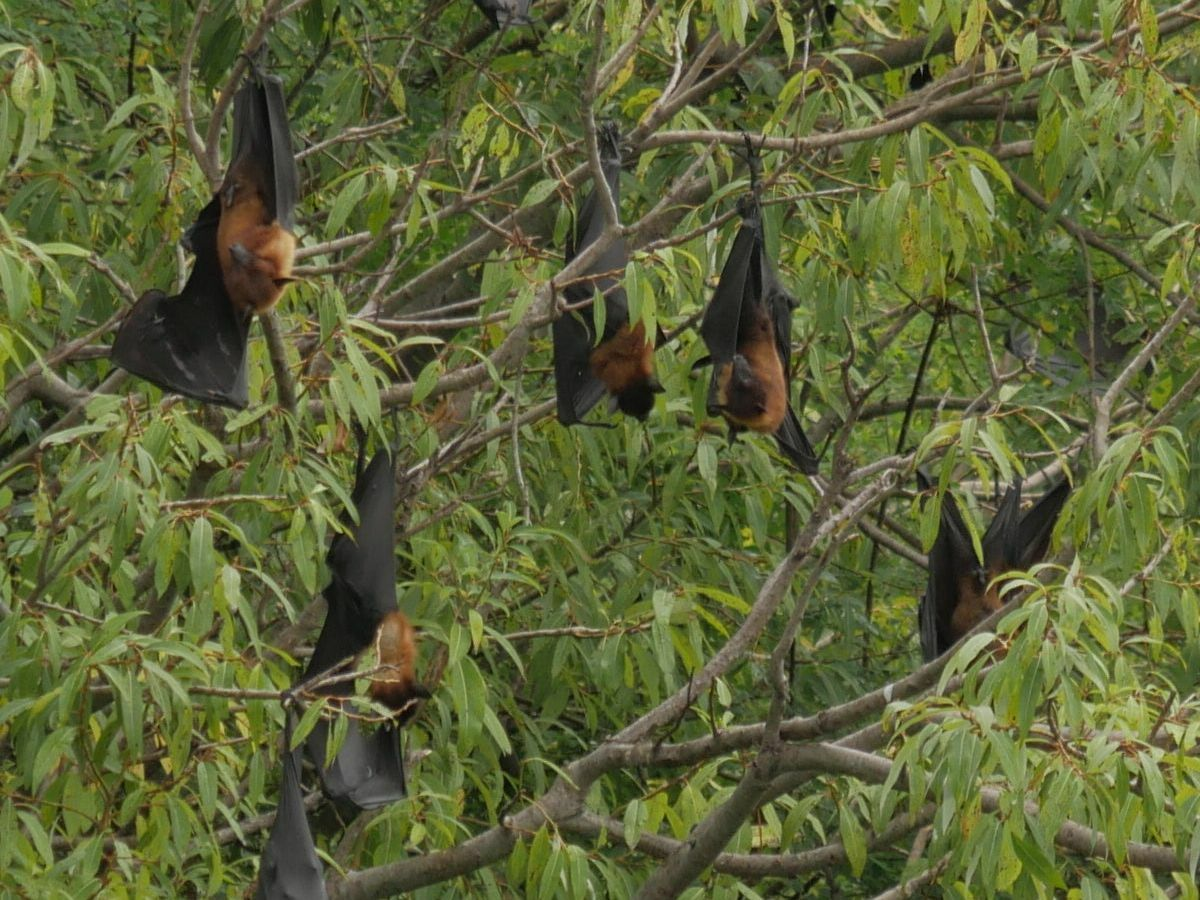
Flying foxes
