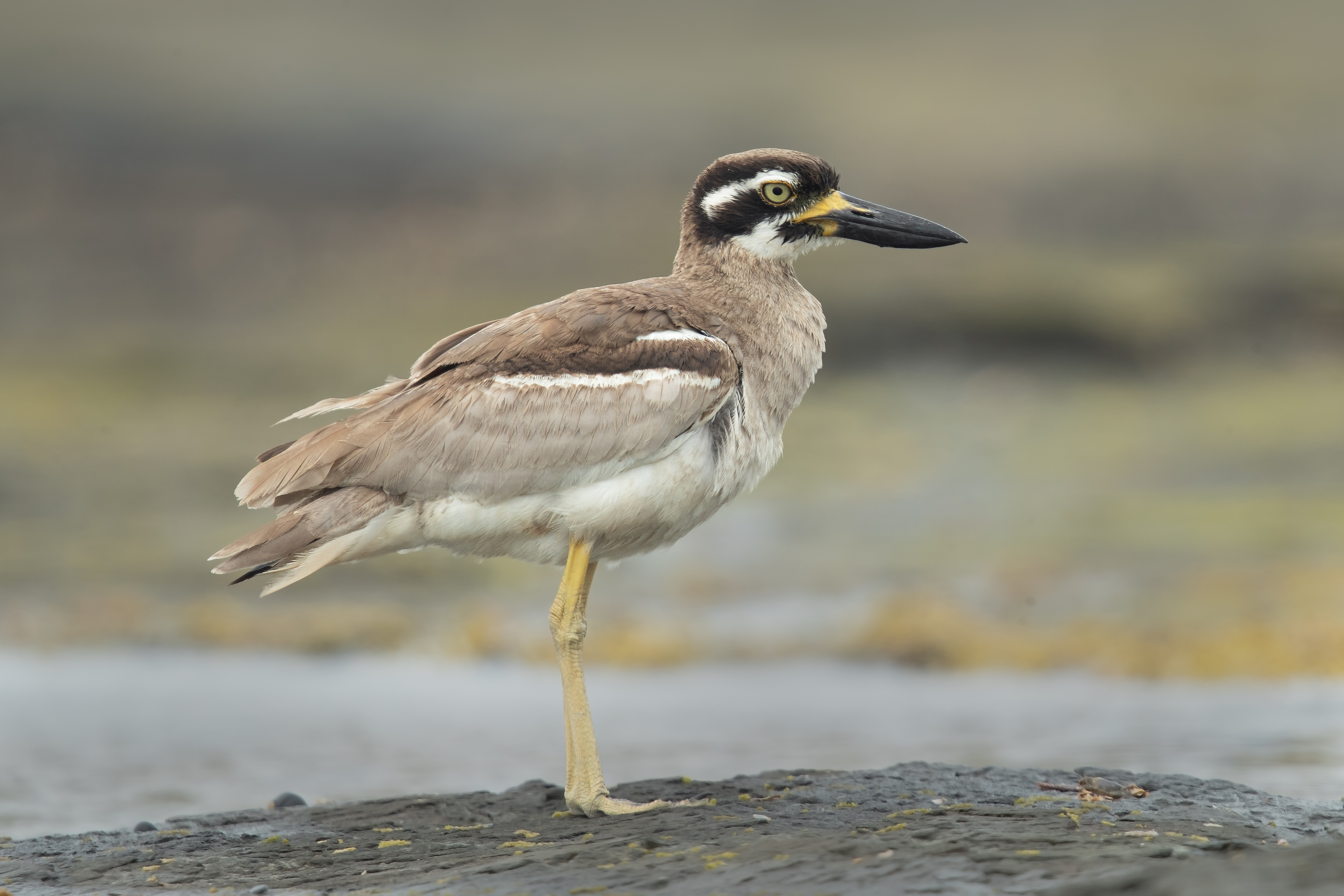
- In New South Wales

Conservation status
- Near Threatened (IUCN 3.1)

Scientific classification
- Kingdom: Animalia
- Phylum: Chordata
- Class: Aves
- Order: Charadriiformes
- Family: Burhinidae
- Genus: Esacus
- Species: E. magnirostris

Binomial name
- Esacus magnirostris (Vieillot, 1818)
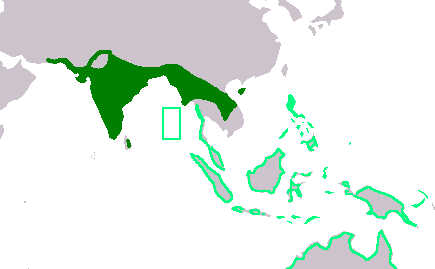
- E. magnirostris range E. recurvirostris range

Synonyms
- Esacus neglectus Burhinus giganteus Wagler, 1829; Burhinus magnirostris

= Beach stone-curlew =

Species of bird

The beach stone-curlew (Esacus magnirostris) or beach thick-knee is a large, ground-dwelling bird that occurs in Australasia, the islands of South-east Asia. At 55 cm (22 in) and 1 kg (2.2 lb), it is one of the world's largest shorebirds.

It is less strictly nocturnal than most stone-curlews, and can sometimes be seen foraging by daylight, moving slowly and deliberately, with occasional short runs. It tends to be wary and fly off into the distance ahead of the observer, employing slow, rather stiff wingbeats..

The beach stone-curlew is classified as Near Threatened on the IUCN Red List of Threatened Species. In New South Wales, it is listed as critically endangered.

== Distribution ==
The beach stone-curlew is a resident of undisturbed open beaches, exposed reefs, mangroves, and tidal sand or mudflats over a large range, including coastal eastern Australia as far south as far eastern Victoria, the northern Australian coast and nearby islands, New Guinea, New Caledonia, Indonesia, Malaysia, and the Philippines. It is uncommon over most of its range, and rare south of Cairns.

== Description ==
The beach stone-curlew is 54-56 cm (21-22 in) long. At a mean of 1,032 g (2.275 lb) in males and 1,000 g (2.2 lb) in females, it is the heaviest living member of the Charadriiformes outside of the gull and skua families. They have black and white face patterning, yellow eyes and a grey-brown upper body.

== Ecology ==
Beach stone-curlew forage on low tide muddy sand for invertebrates, mostly crabs.

=== Breeding ===
The breeding season spans from September to November. Birds form a nest in sand, laying one egg per season just above the high tide line on the open beach, where it is vulnerable to predation and human disturbance. Both parents care for the young until they reach 7-12 months of age.

=== Call ===
As an alarm, the bird will make a chwip-chwip to ward creatures away from their territory.

== Gallery ==
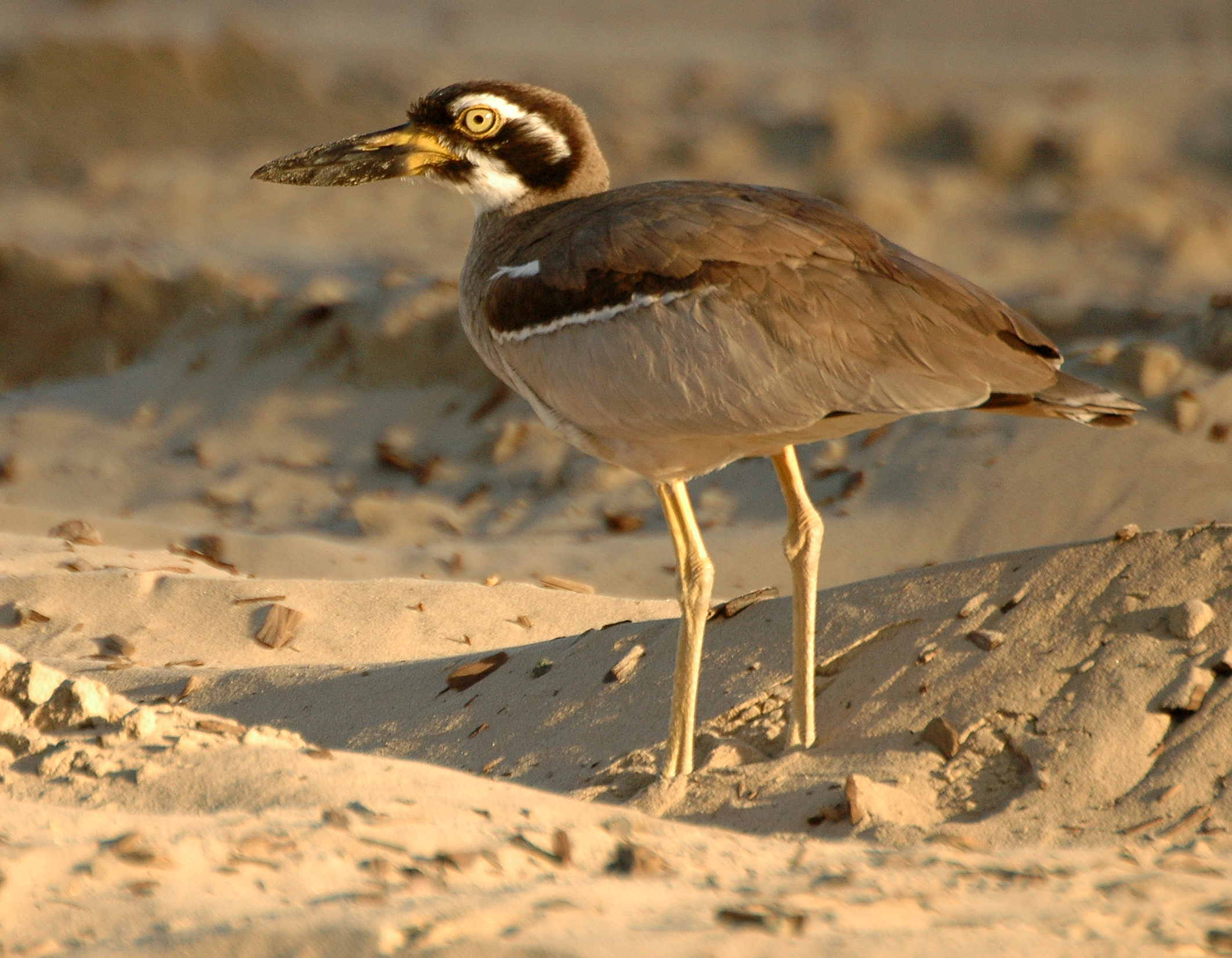
At Inskip Point, SE Queensland, Australia

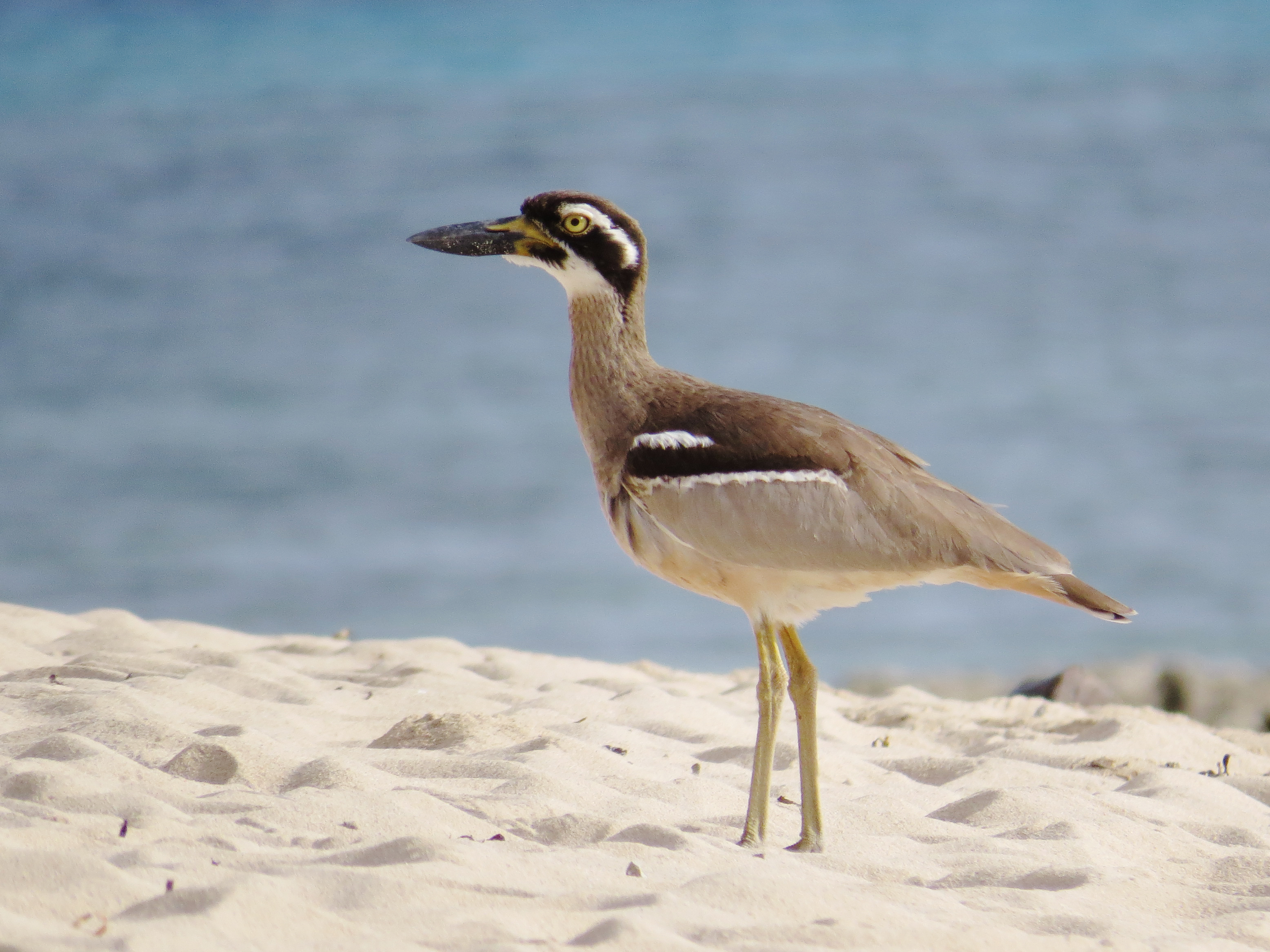
On Green Island off Cairns

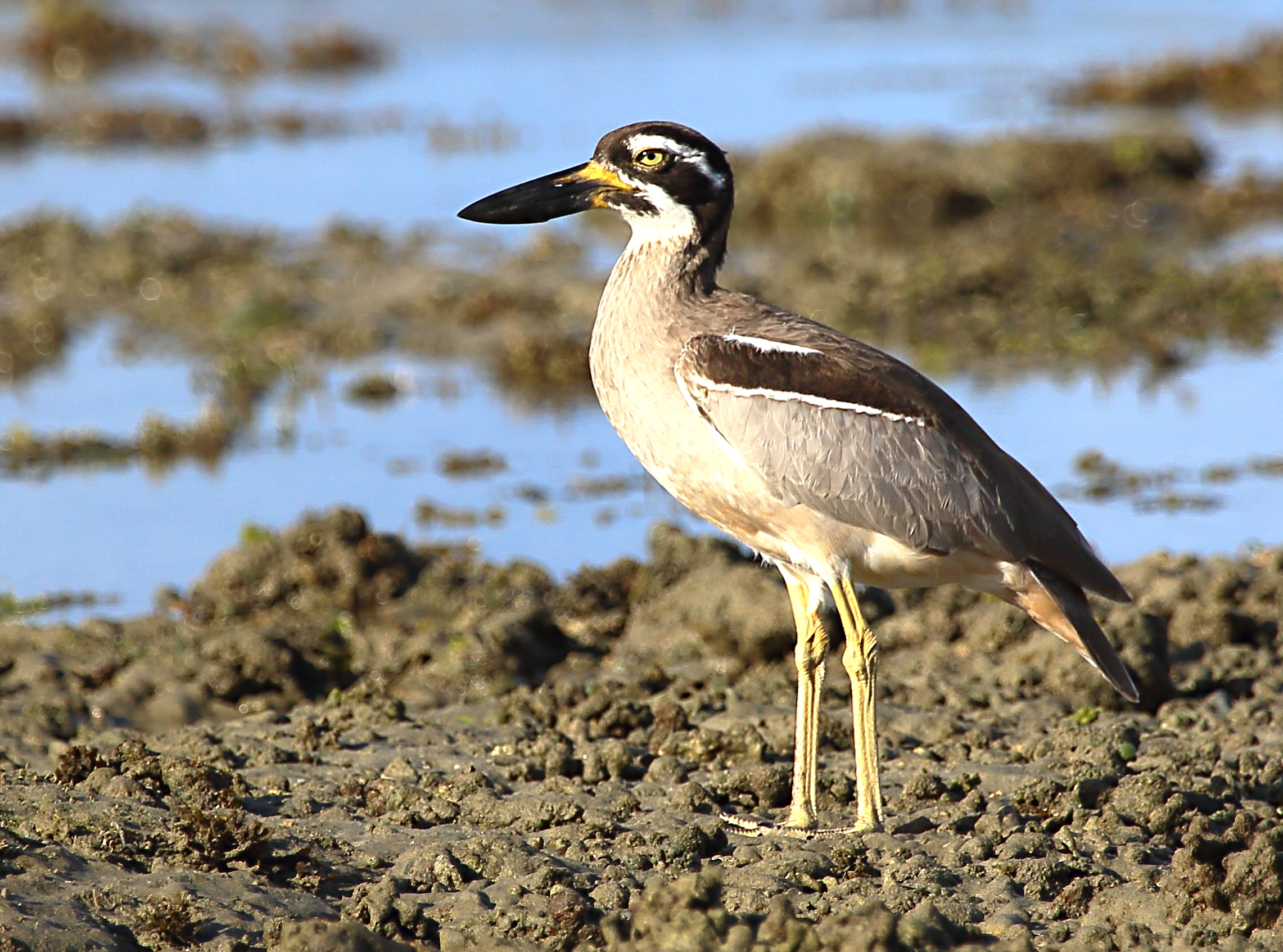
At Cape Tribulation, north Queensland, Australia
