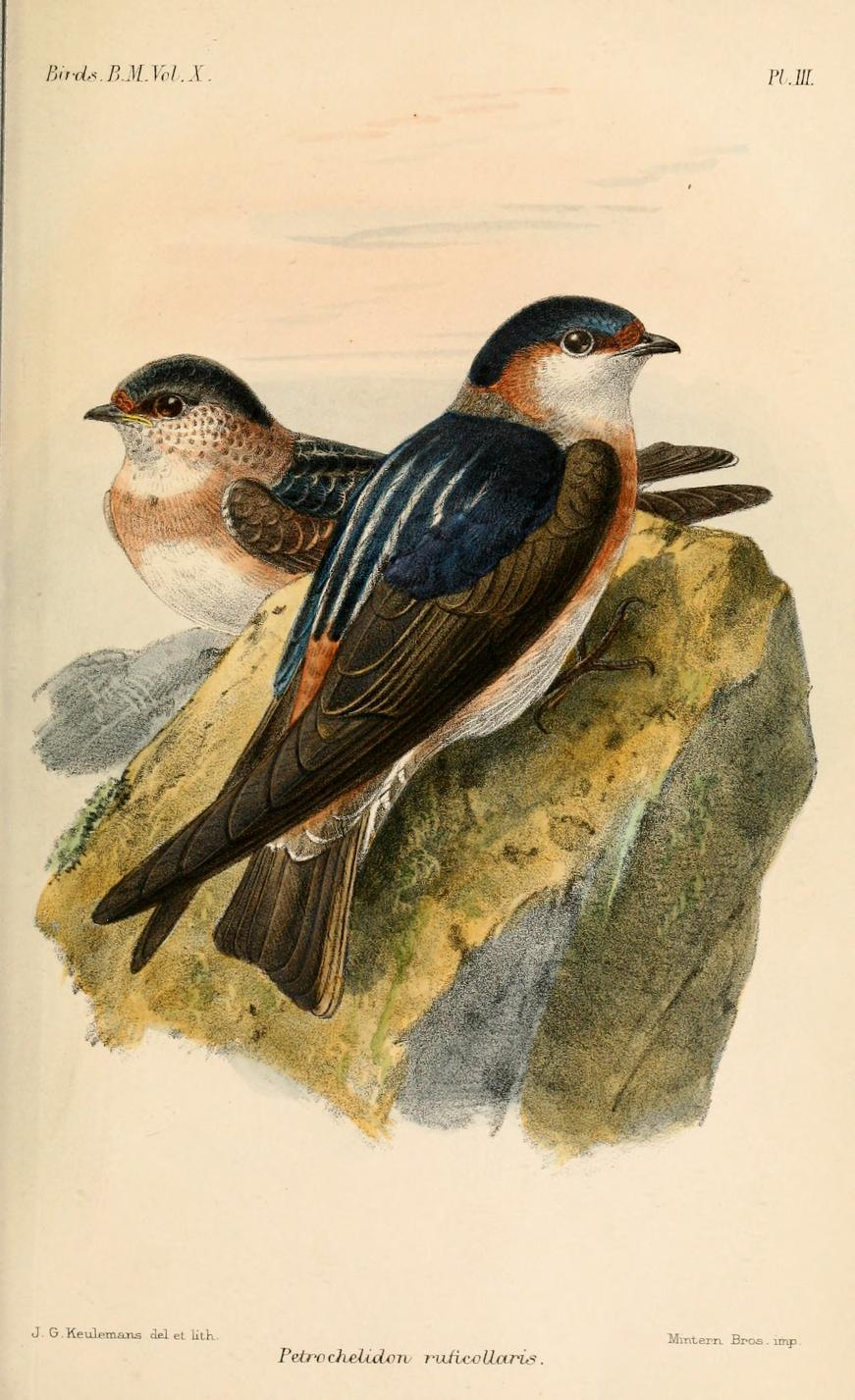
- Illustration by Keulemans, 1885

Conservation status
- Least Concern (IUCN 3.1)

Scientific classification
- Kingdom: Animalia
- Phylum: Chordata
- Class: Aves
- Order: Passeriformes
- Family: Hirundinidae
- Genus: Petrochelidon
- Species: P. rufocollaris

Binomial name
- Petrochelidon rufocollaris (Peale, 1849)

= Chestnut-collared swallow =

Species of bird

The chestnut-collared swallow (Petrochelidon rufocollaris) is a species of bird in the family Hirundinidae, the swallows and martins. It is found in Ecuador and Peru.

== Taxonomy and systematics ==
The chestnut-collared swallow was originally described as Hirundo rufocollaris in Titian Peale's catalog of birds collected during the United States Exploring Expedition. It was later reclassified in its current genus Petrochelidon that had been erected in 1851. Some authors have treated it as a subspecies of the cave swallow (P. fulva) and the two form a superspecies.

The chestnut-collared swallow has two subspecies, the nominate P. r. rufocollaris (Peale, 1849) and P. r. aequatorialis (Chapman, 1924).

== Description ==
The chestnut-collared swallow is 12 to 12.5 cm (4.7 to 4.9 in) long and weighs 14 to 18 g (0.49 to 0.63 oz). Both sexes of both subspecies have essentially the same plumage. Adults have a dark chestnut forecrown and hindneck. Their crown and back are glossy blue-black with white streaks on the mantle and their rump is chestnut. Their ear coverts and throat are white that sometimes has a buff tinge. Their wings and tail are blackish brown. Their underparts are partially white with a rufous-chestnut band across the upper breast, rufous-chestnut flanks, and a brown or chestnut vent. They have a black bill, pinkish brown legs, and black feet. Juveniles are duller and browner than adults.

== Distribution and habitat ==
Subspecies P. r. aequatorialis of the chestnut-collared swallow is the more northerly of the two. It is found in southwestern Ecuador from central Manabí Province south about to the Peruvian border in Loja Province. The nominate subspecies is found from there south in Peru through Lima Department. The species primarily inhabits agricultural areas and their associated towns. In elevation it ranges from sea level to about 2,000 m (6,600 ft) in Ecuador and to 1,000 m (3,300 ft) in Peru.

== Behavior ==
=== Feeding ===
The chestnut-collared swallow's diet has not been studied. It is assumed to feed on insects captured in mid-air like other swallows. It forages in flocks that often include other swallow species, usually low to the ground over fields and around buildings.

=== Breeding ===
The chestnut-collared swallow breeds between January and August in Ecuador; its season in Peru has not been defined but includes June. It builds an enclosed nest structure from mud, typically placed on the walls of human structures and often under the eaves. Historically it apparently built them on cliffs. The eggs, clutch size, incubation period, time to fledging, and details of parental care are not known.

=== Vocalization ===
The chestnut-collared swallow's call is a "quiet chit" and it also makes "a creaking grrreeee". Its call has also been described as "a gravelly chrrt".

== Status ==
The IUCN has assessed the chestnut-collared swallow as being of Least Concern. It has a large range; its population size is not known but is believed to be increasing. No immediate threats have been identified. It is considered "locally numerous" in Ecuador and "locally common" in Peru. It is "[l]ikely to have benefited from increased nest sites provided by buildings".
