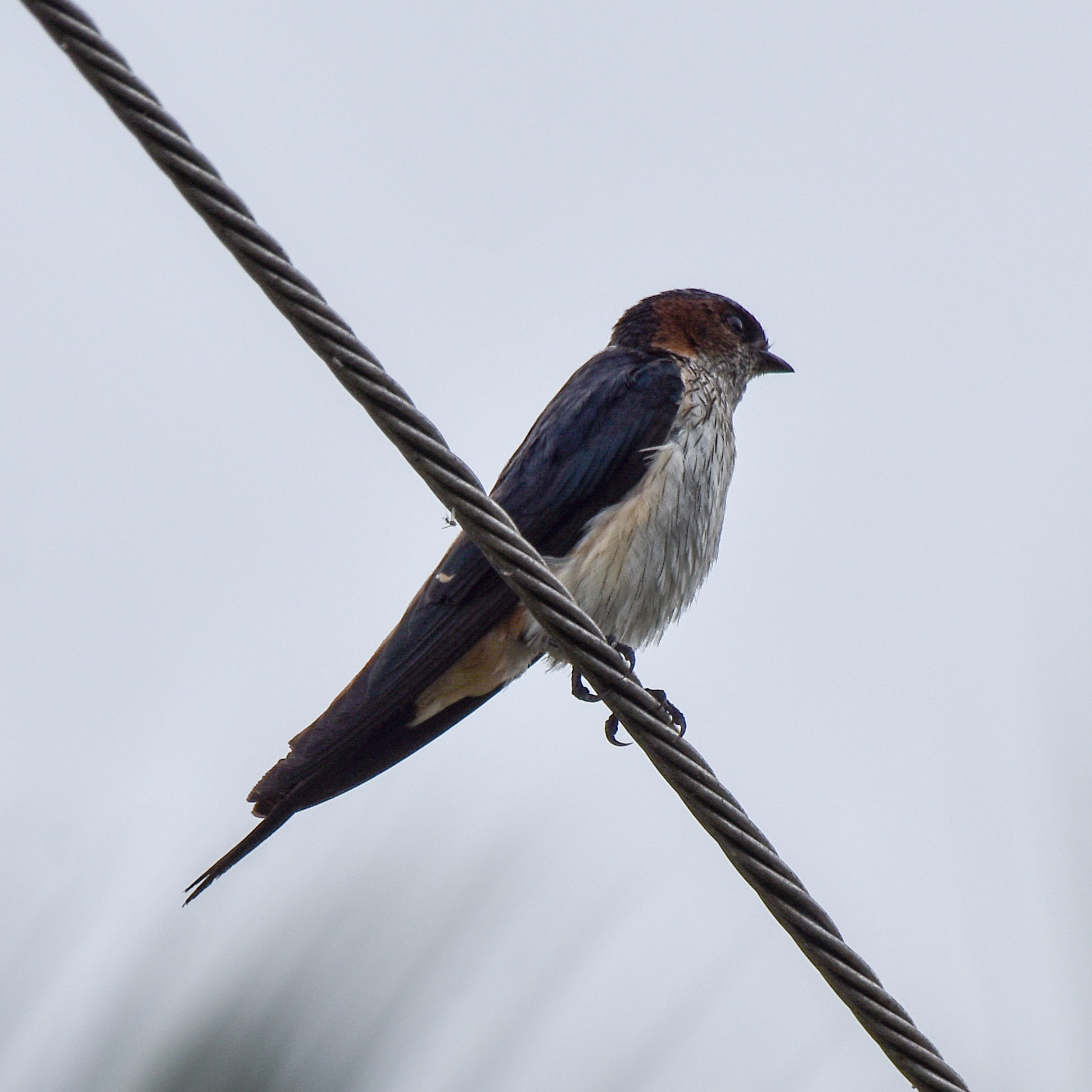

Conservation status
- Least Concern (IUCN 3.1)

Scientific classification
- Kingdom: Animalia
- Phylum: Chordata
- Class: Aves
- Order: Passeriformes
- Family: Hirundinidae
- Genus: Petrochelidon
- Species: P. fluvicola

Binomial name
- Petrochelidon fluvicola (Blyth, 1855)

Synonyms
- Hirundo fluvicola

= Streak-throated swallow =

Species of song bird

The streak-throated swallow or the Indian cliff swallow (Petrochelidon fluvicola) is a passerine bird, which includes a large number of other species including many swallows. It is native of South Asia where it is a breeder, year-round resident or winter visitor in the countries of Afghanistan, India, Nepal and Pakistan. It occurs as a vagrant in the Maldives, Sri Lanka, and the Middle East.

== Taxonomy ==
The streak-throated swallow was first identified by the English zoologist Edward Blyth in 1855. It is currently placed in the genus Petrochelidon, identified by the German ornithologist Jean Cabanis in 1850. A synonym is Hirundo fluvicola. It belongs to the family Hirundinidae, named by the French polymath Constantine Samuel Rafinesque in 1815.

== Description ==
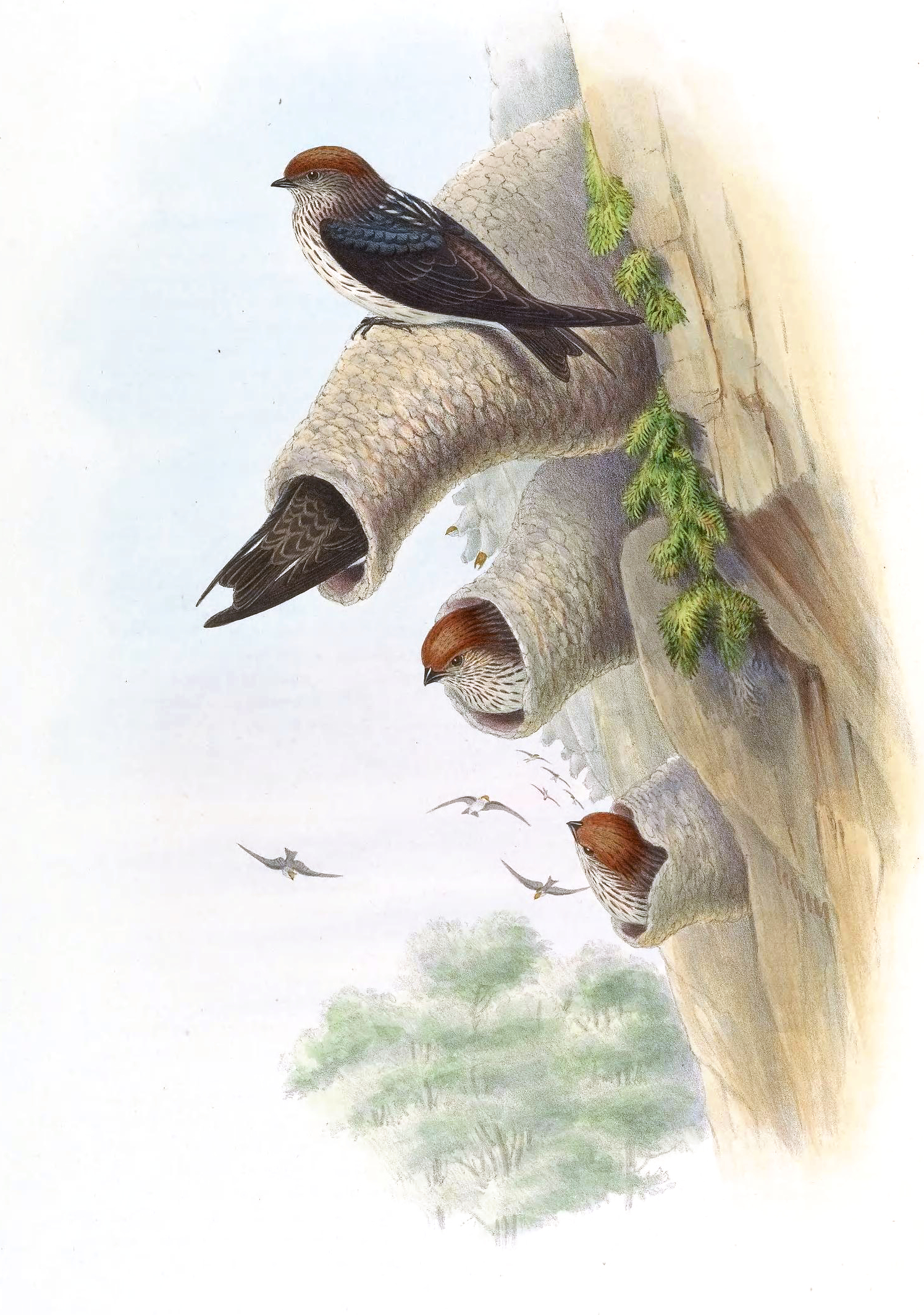
John Gould illustration of nests

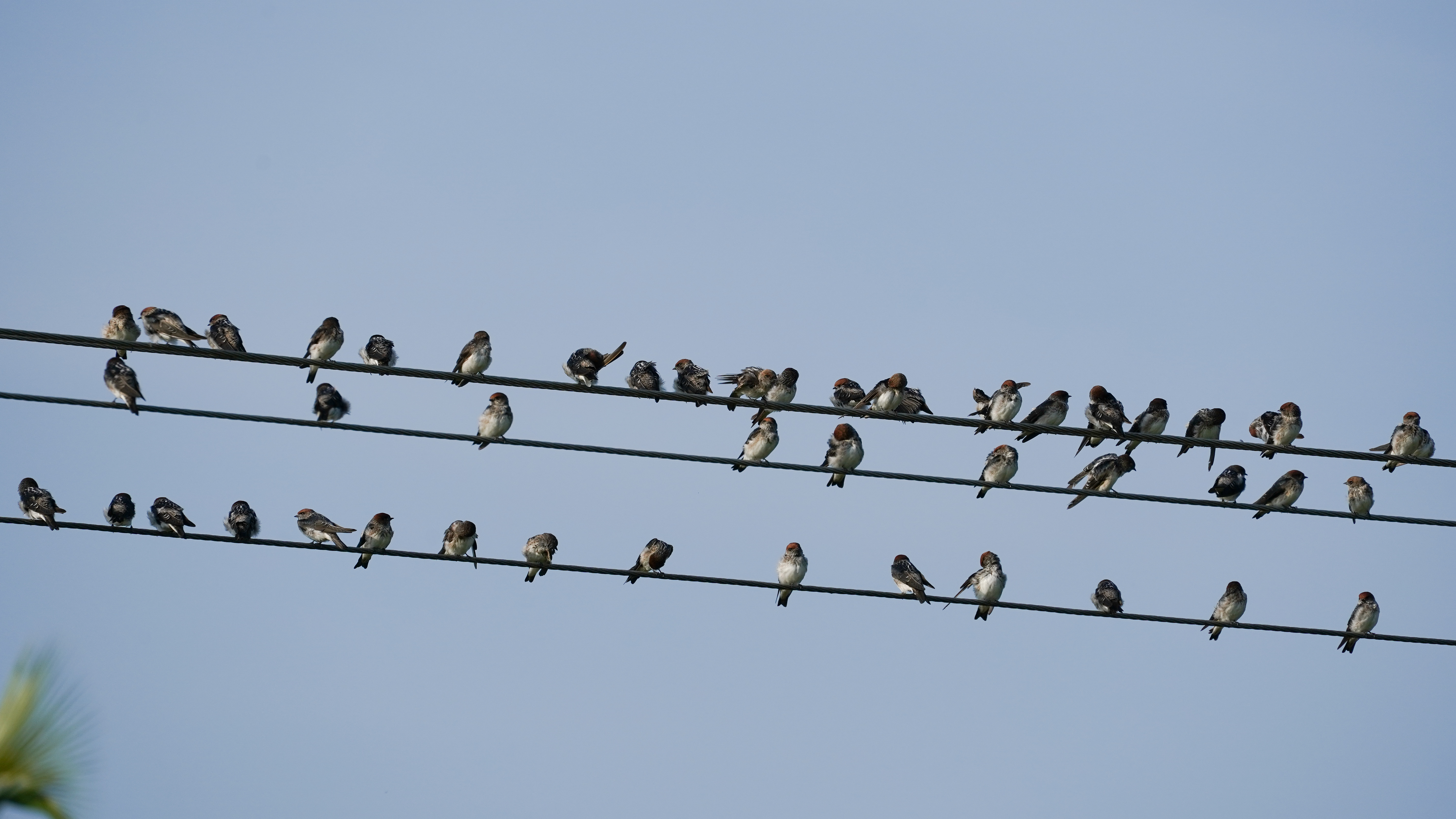
Flock close-packed on electric wires, Srirangapatna

The streak-throated swallow is a sparrow-sized bird about 11 cm (4.3 in) in length. It has a dull chestnut forehead and crown. The underparts are whitish, the upper feathers are steel-blue. The rump is pale brown and the tail has a square end. The brown streaks on the throat and chest are distinctive and used to differentiate from other similar birds. On cold mornings, large flocks are seen closely-packed on electric wires to catch the early sun. Its voice is a twittering chirp while perched. In flight, it utters a sharp trr-trr.

== Distribution and habitat ==
The streak-throated swallow is a year-round resident in much of South Asia. It is found from the plains of Pakistan east along the base of the Himalayas to Sikkim. The range extends southwards through the Indian peninsula up to Point Calimere in the Indian state of Tamil Nadu. It is found in large colonies in cultivated fields and open areas near ponds, lakes, canals and rivers.

== Behaviour and ecology ==
The diet consists of midges and other tiny winged insects which are caught in the air. The nesting season is almost year-round, from December to April and July to October. The birds build large colonial nests of mud. They consist of many pot-like nests fused together. Entrance to each nest is via a short tube.

Flocks of streak-throated sparrows appear to be attached to specific locations. This may be influenced by proximity to sources of food. In a college in Rajasthan, India, a flock of streak-throated swallows had built a nest colony about 9 m (30 ft) above the ground, under the roof. The nests were destroyed during renovation of the building in October 2010. Within 4 days, the birds started to rebuild the nests and they completed the colony within 4 months. Every year, despite destruction of their nests during cleaning of the building, the flock returned to the same site and rebuilt the nesting colony.

== Gallery ==
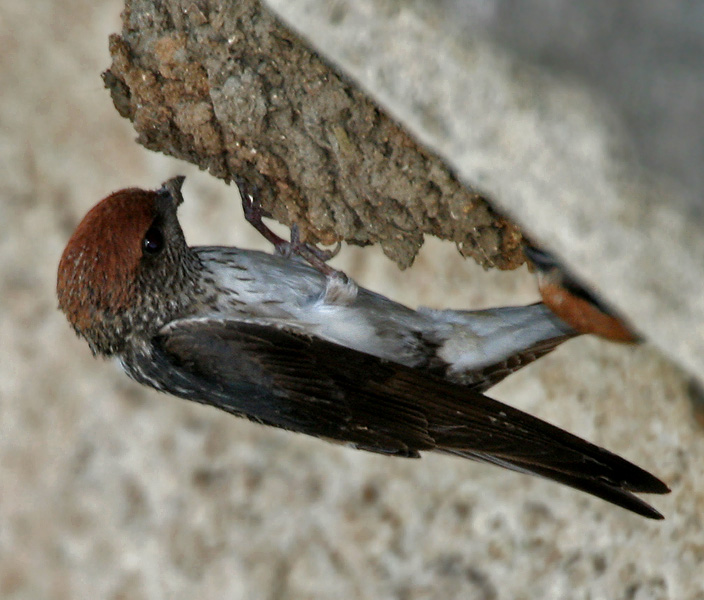
Building nest in Kawal Wildlife Sanctuary, India

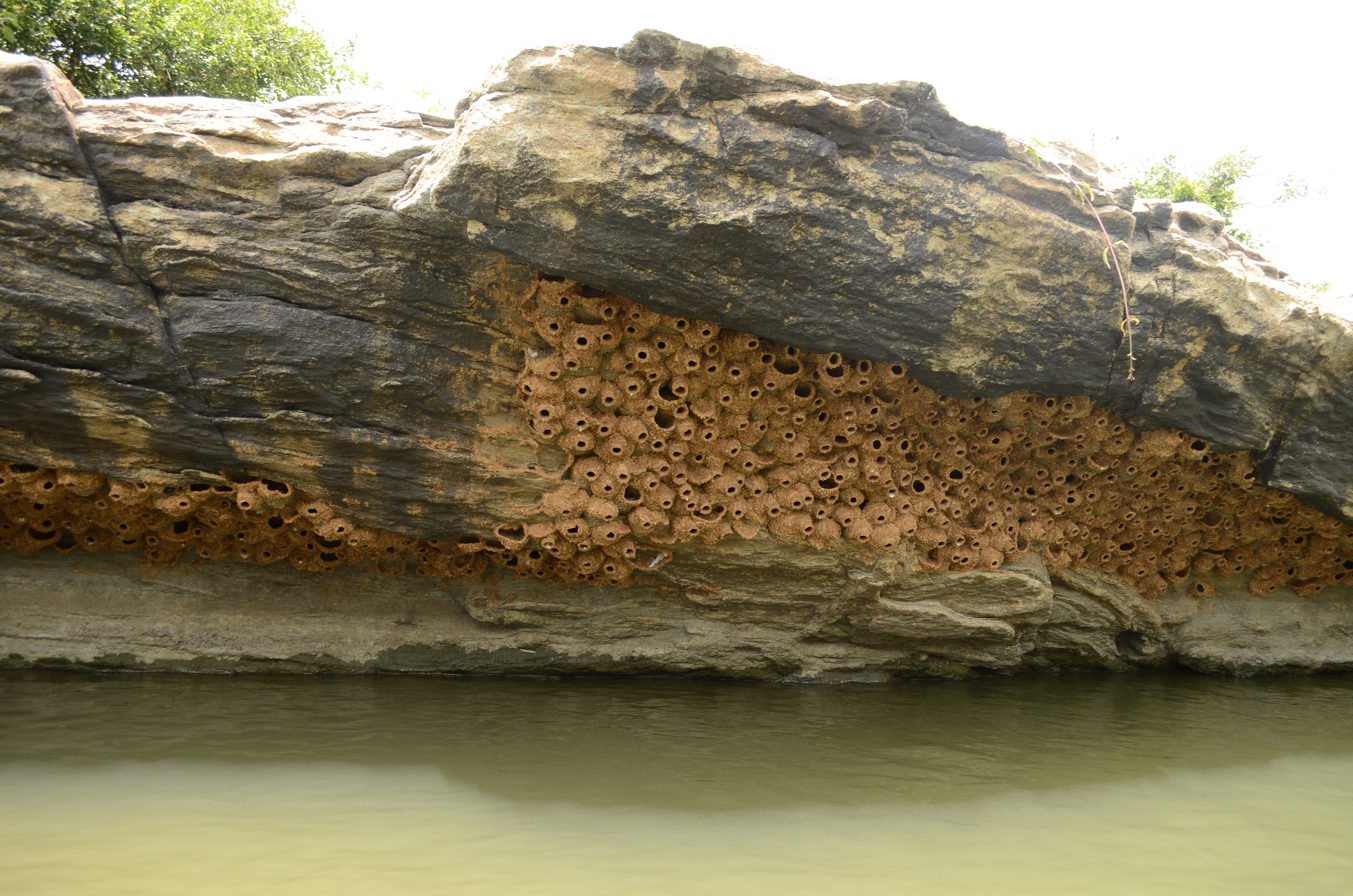
Nest colony, Ranganathittu Bird Sanctuary, Karnataka

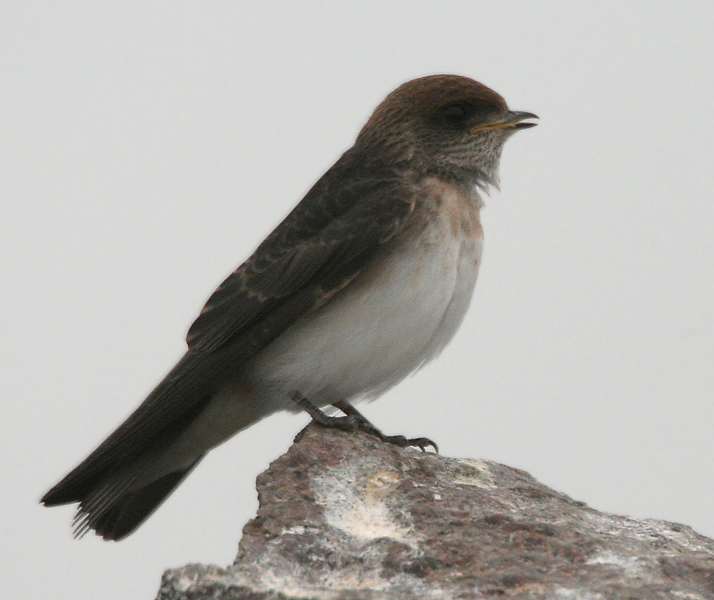
Perched, Hyderabad, India

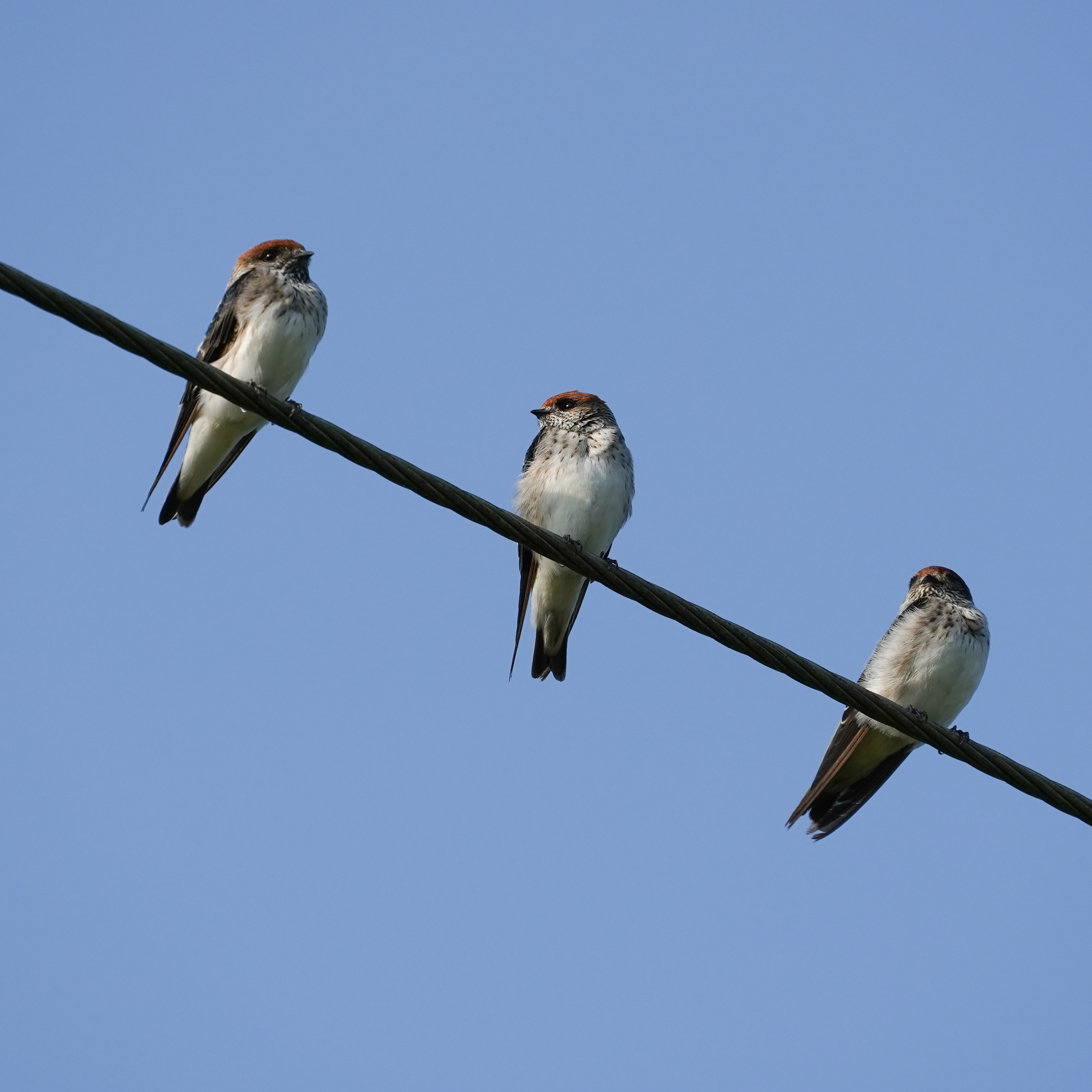
Perched on an electric wire, Srirangapatna, Karnataka

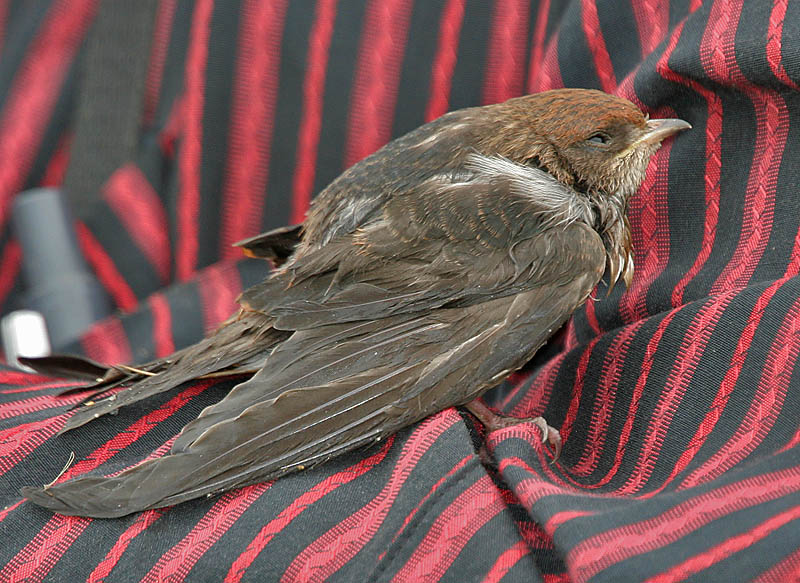
Rescued in Hyderabad, India
