= Red Sea cliff swallow =

Conservation status
- Data Deficient (IUCN 3.1)

Scientific classification
- Kingdom: Animalia
- Phylum: Chordata
- Class: Aves
- Order: Passeriformes
- Family: Hirundinidae
- Genus: Petrochelidon
- Species: P. perdita

Binomial name
- Petrochelidon perdita (Fry & D. A. Smith, 1985)

Synonyms
- Hirundo perdita Fry & D. A. Smith, 1985

Species of bird

The Red Sea cliff swallow (Petrochelidon perdita), also known as the Red Sea swallow, is a species of bird in the family Hirundinidae.

== Distribution and habitat ==
It is possibly endemic to Sudan. It is known only from a single specimen, found in May 1984 at the Sanganeb lighthouse, north-east of Port Sudan, Sudan. Its scientific name means the lost swallow and it has been suggested that it might breed in the hills surrounding the Red Sea in Sudan or Ethiopia.

This enigmatic swallow may still exist, as unidentified cliff swallows have been sighted a number of times in Ethiopia which may have been this species, although they may belong to an additional undescribed species due to a number of plumage differences. Two unidentified pale-rumped swallows were also observed in 1983 at Sanganeb heading out over the Red Sea in the direction of Jeddah just prior to his discovery of the dead type specimen, so it has been suggested it may breed in hills fringing the Red Sea coast of western Saudi Arabia.
