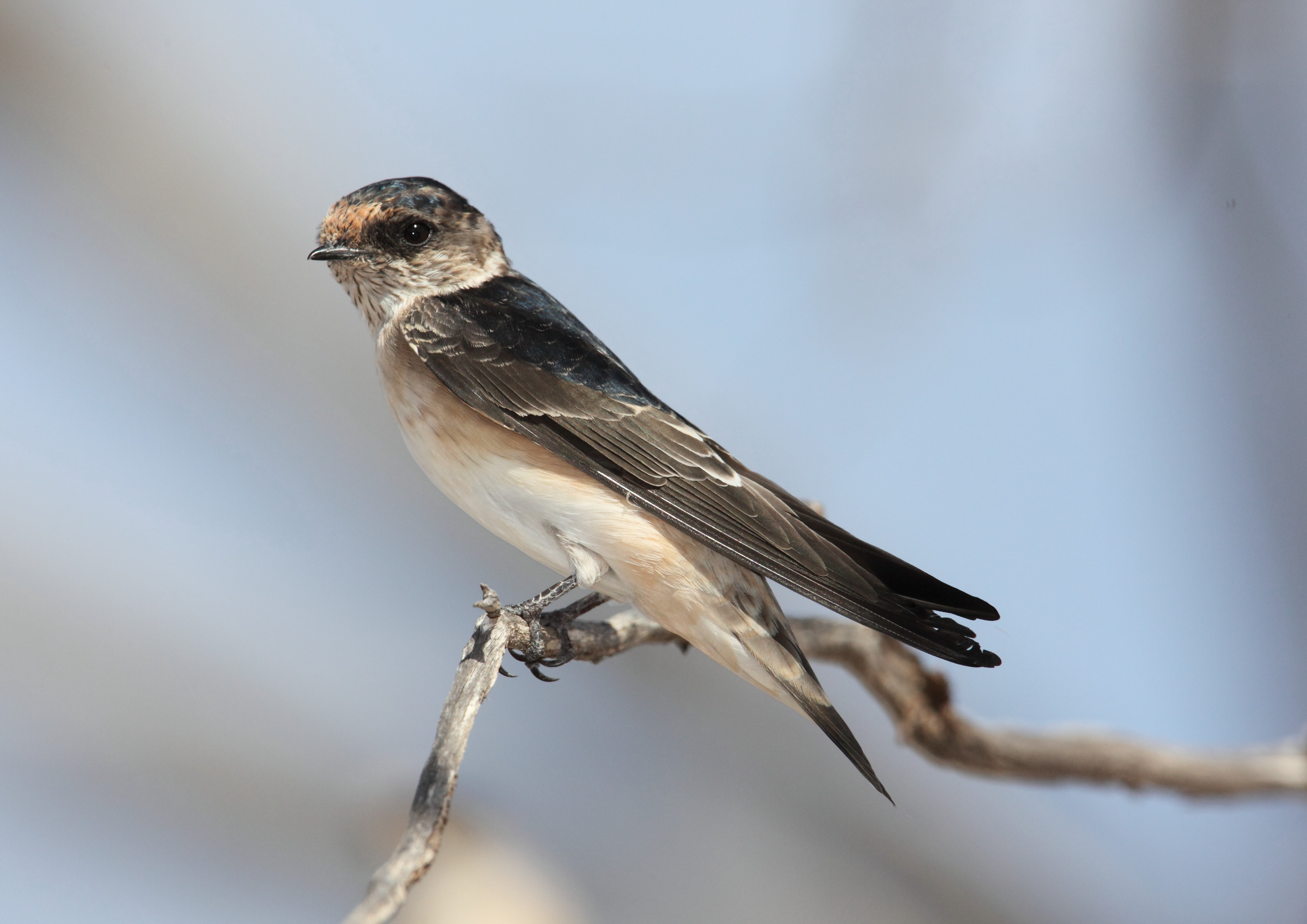

Conservation status
- Least Concern (IUCN 3.1)

Scientific classification
- Kingdom: Animalia
- Phylum: Chordata
- Class: Aves
- Order: Passeriformes
- Family: Hirundinidae
- Genus: Petrochelidon
- Species: P. nigricans

Binomial name
- Petrochelidon nigricans (Vieillot, 1817)

= Tree martin =

Species of bird

The tree martin (Petrochelidon nigricans) is a member of the swallow family of passerine birds. It breeds in Australia, mostly south of latitude 20°S, and on Timor island. It is migratory, wintering through most of Australia, New Guinea, Indonesia east of the Wallace Line, and the Solomon Islands. It is a vagrant to New Zealand, where it has bred, and New Caledonia. This species is frequently placed in the genus Hirundo as Hirundo nigricans.

This is a bird of open woodland, preferably with large trees to provide nest holes. It is increasingly common in urban and suburban areas.

== Taxonomy ==
The tree martin was formally described in 1817 by the French ornithologist Louis Vieillot under the binomial name Hirundo nigricans. The specific epithet is Latin meaning "blackish". Vieillot gave the type locality as "Nouvelle-Hollande" (New South Wales) but this has been corrected to Hobart, Tasmania. The tree martin is now one of ten swallows placed in the genus Petrochelidon that was introduced in 1851 by the German ornithologist Jean Cabanis.

Three subspecies are recognised:

- P. n. timoriensis Sharpe, 1885 – the smallest subspecies, breeds on Sumba, Timor and Alor Island (southwest, east Lesser Sunda Islands). It has dark streaks on the throat and neck.
- P. n. neglecta Mathews, 1912 – breeds in western and northern Australia. It is slightly smaller than nominate nigricans at 11–12 cm (4.3–4.7 in) in length.
- P. n. nigricans (Vieillot, 1817) – the largest subspecies, breeds in eastern Australia, except northern Queensland and Tasmania. It is the form that has bred in New Zealand.

== Description ==
The tree martin averages 13 cm (5.1 in) in length and has a shallowly forked tail. The adult has an iridescent blue back and crown, brown wings and tail, a rufous forehead and a whitish rump. The underparts are white. The sexes are similar, but young birds are duller and browner, with a paler forehead and pale fringes to the back and wing feathers.

The call of this vocal swallow is a tsweet and the song is a high-pitched twitter.

This species can be distinguished from other Australian swallows by its tail shape and pale rump. The most similar species, the fairy martin, has a rufous head and nape.

== Behaviour ==
Tree martins breed, depending on region, from July through to January, either in pairs or semi-colonially depending on nest site availability. Nests are constructed in natural holes in dead trees or rock crevices, but increasingly in artificial sites on bridges and buildings. This is most common in western Australia, where breeding occurs even in large cities like Adelaide and Perth. Tree martins also occasionally reline the nests of welcome swallows, and may displace the owners to obtain the nest.

The nest, unusually for a cliff swallow, is often made just from grass and leaves, but may be reinforced with mud. A mud and plant fibre cement is also used to reduce the width of the entrance to the breeding hole. The clutch is 3–5, usually four, brown and mauve-spotted white eggs, and this species is often double-brooded.

Tree martins have a fast twisting flight and feed higher than welcome swallows, often more than 6 m above the ground. They are frequently seen above the canopy of tall eucalyptus trees catching aerial insects, but will also feed on insect swarms low over water. This species can be highly gregarious when not breeding, and will form mixed flocks with fairy martins.

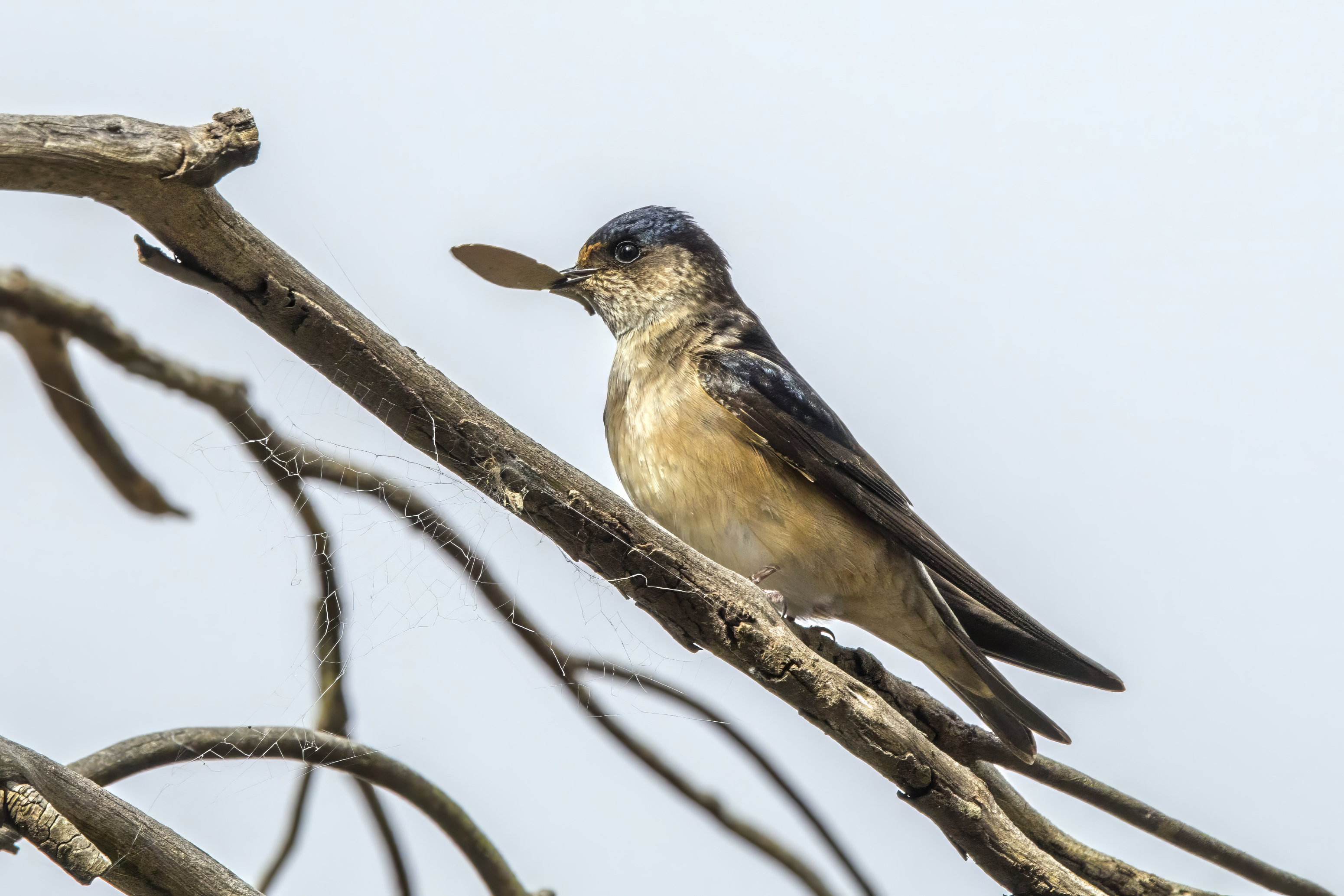
with nesting material, South Bruny

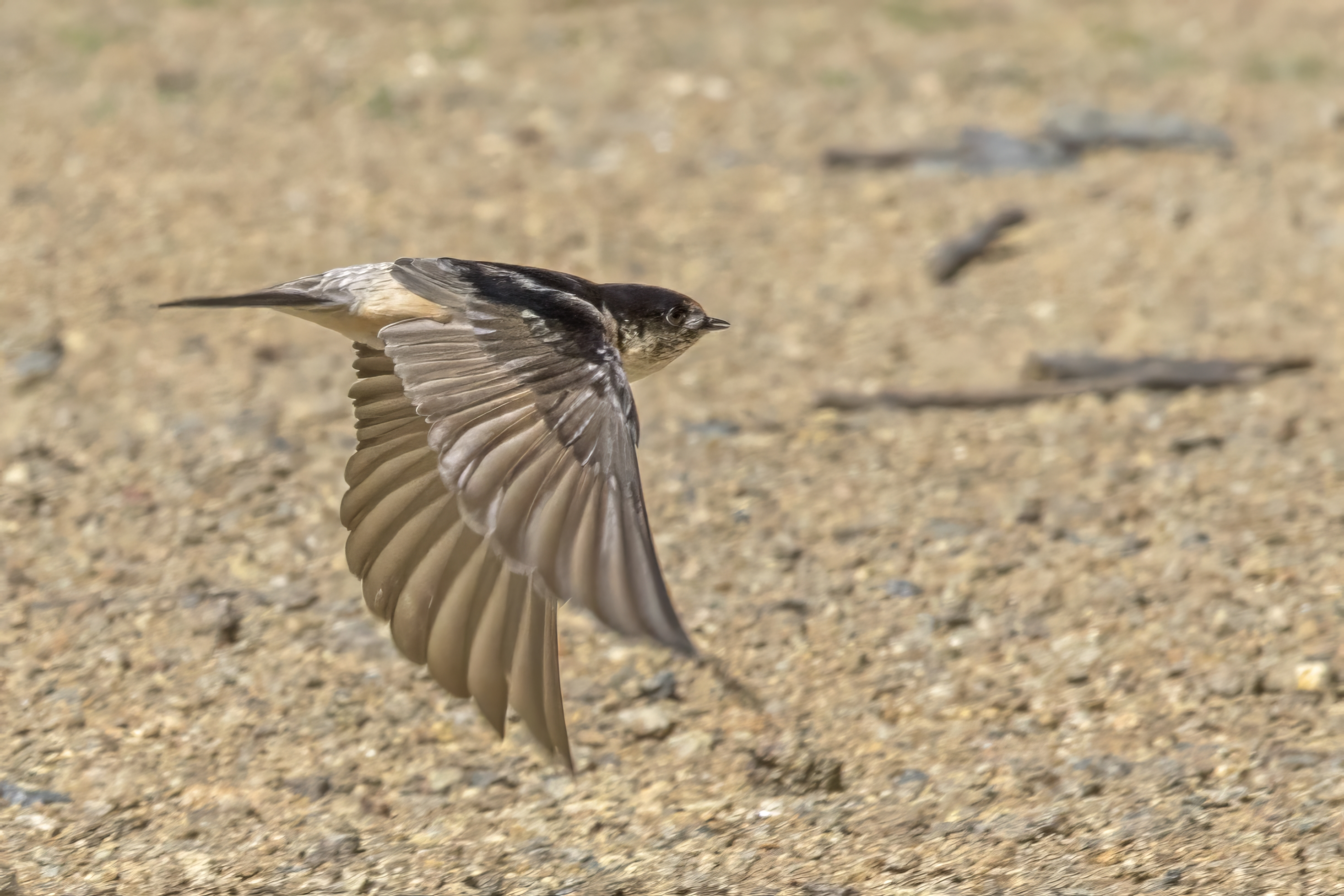
Maria Island

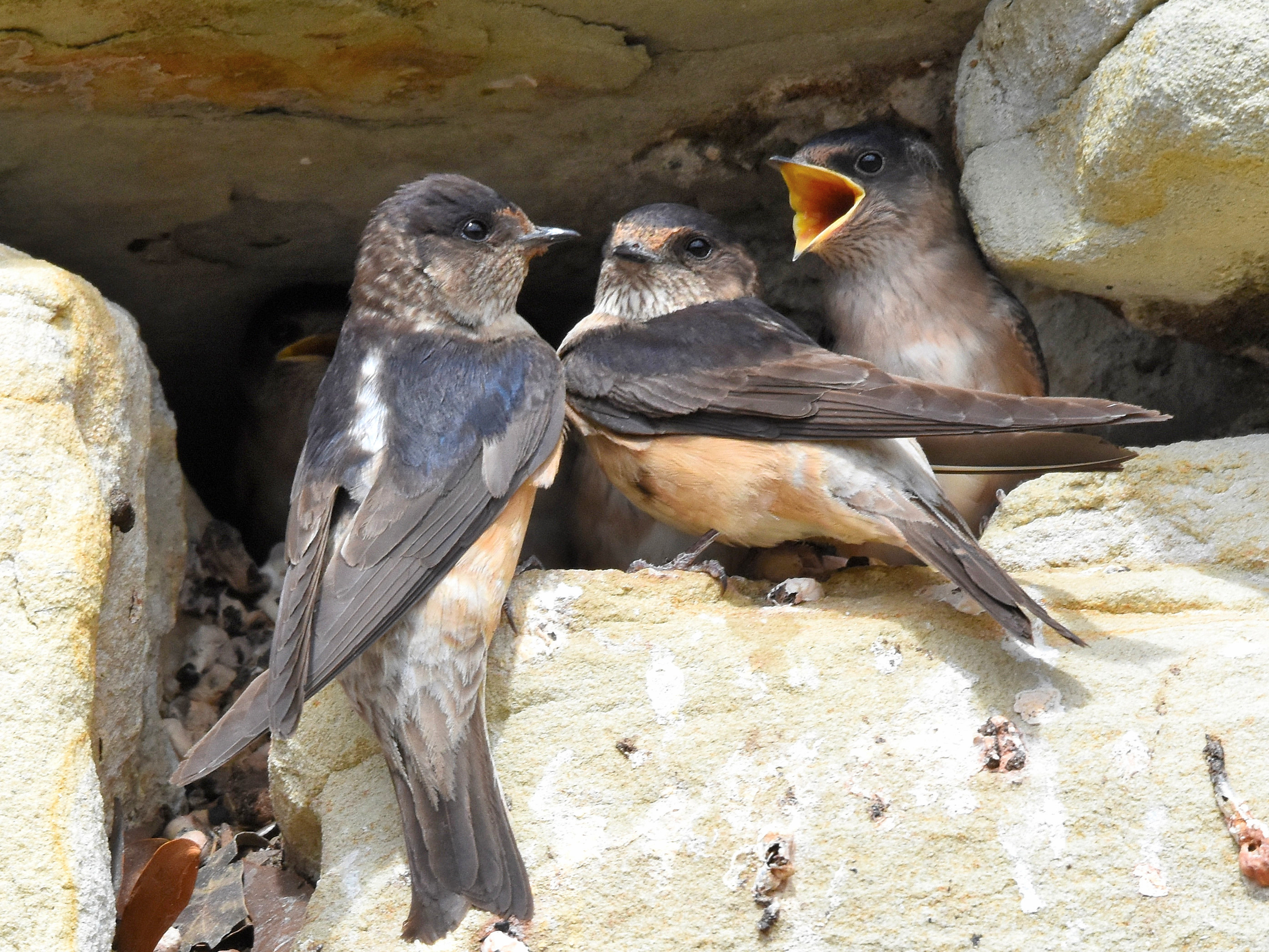
Tree martin with two hungry chicks.
