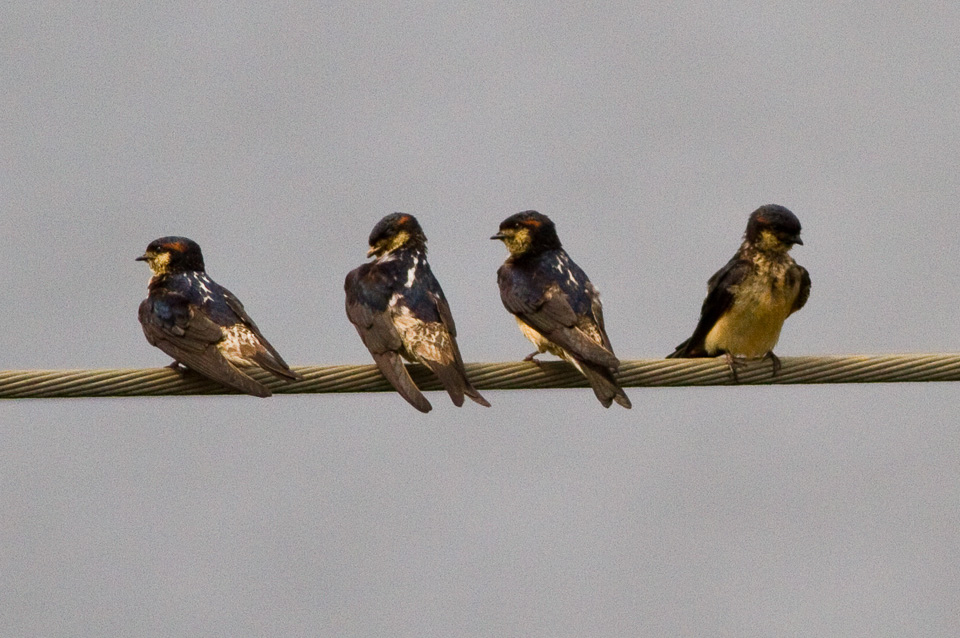
- Four in Southwest Region, Cameroon

Conservation status
- Least Concern (IUCN 3.1)

Scientific classification
- Kingdom: Animalia
- Phylum: Chordata
- Class: Aves
- Order: Passeriformes
- Family: Hirundinidae
- Genus: Petrochelidon
- Species: P. preussi

Binomial name
- Petrochelidon preussi (Reichenow, 1898)

Synonyms
- Hirundo preussi

= Preuss's cliff swallow =

Species of bird

Preuss's cliff swallow (Petrochelidon preussi), also known as Preuss's swallow, is a species of bird in the family Hirundinidae.

== Distribution and habitat ==
It is found in Benin, Burkina Faso, Cameroon, Central African Republic, Chad, Republic of the Congo, Ivory Coast, Equatorial Guinea, Ghana, Guinea, Guinea-Bissau, Mali, Niger, Nigeria, Sierra Leone, and Togo.
