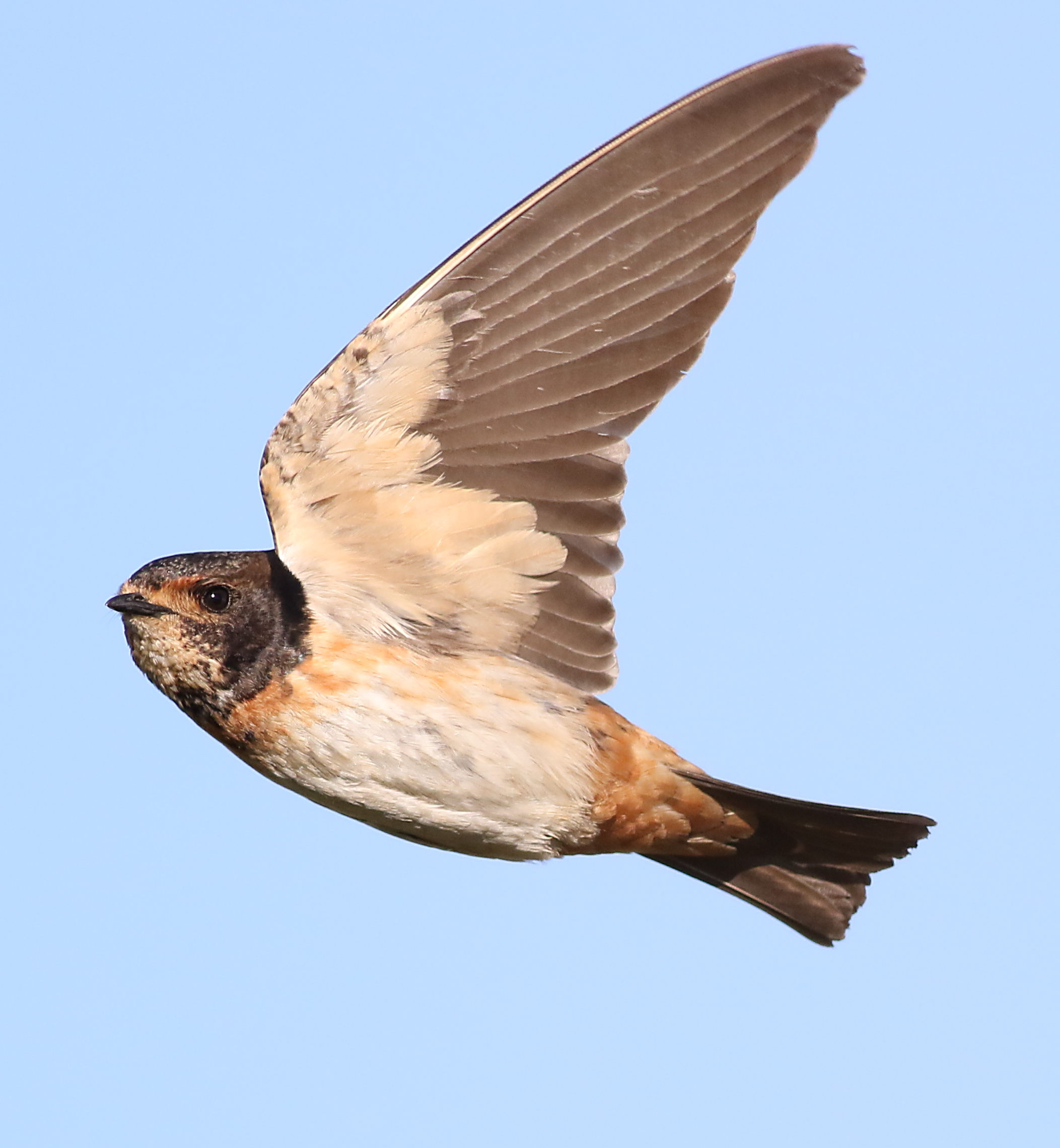
- In flight, at Suikerbosrand Nature Reserve, Gauteng, South Africa

Conservation status
- Least Concern (IUCN 3.1)

Scientific classification
- Kingdom: Animalia
- Phylum: Chordata
- Class: Aves
- Order: Passeriformes
- Family: Hirundinidae
- Genus: Petrochelidon
- Species: P. spilodera

Binomial name
- Petrochelidon spilodera (Sundevall, 1850)
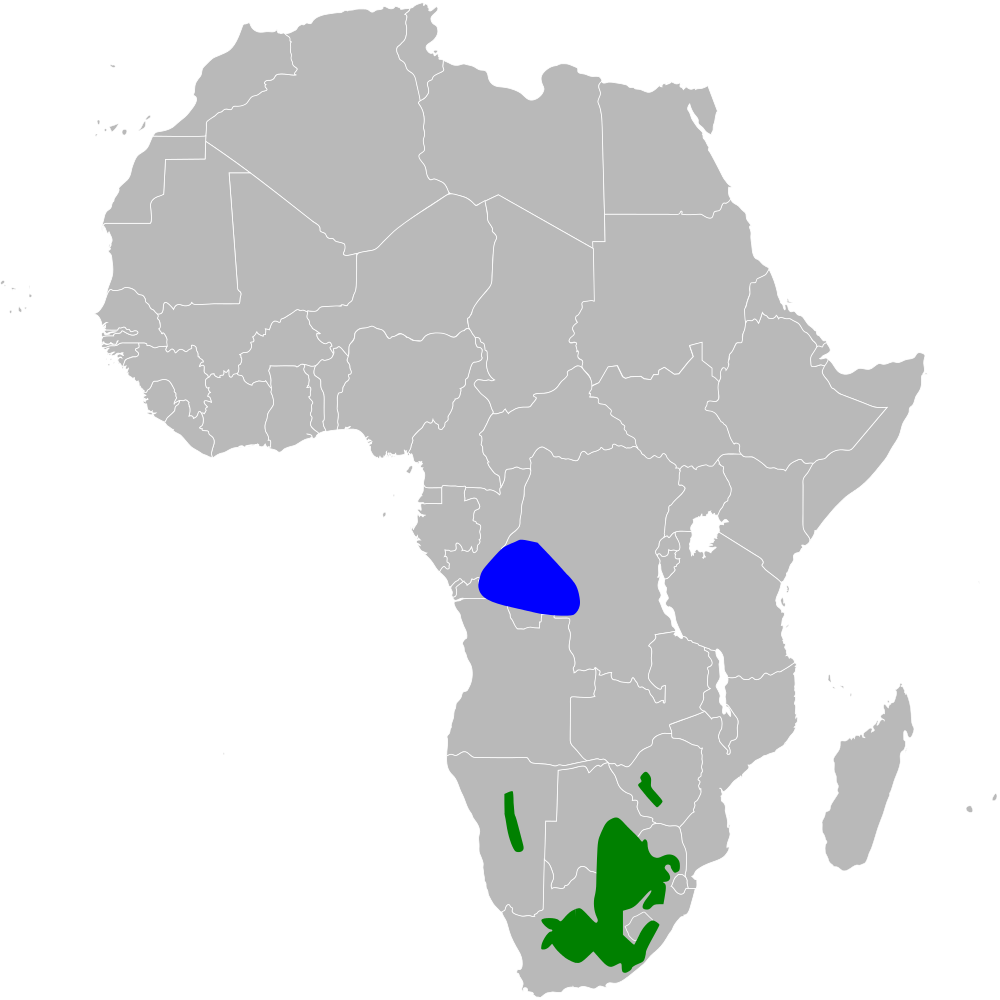

Synonyms
- Hirundo spilodera

= South African cliff swallow =

Species of bird

The South African cliff swallow (Petrochelidon spilodera), also known as the South African swallow, is a species of bird in the family Hirundinidae native southern Africa. It winters to the lower Congo Basin.

Nests are commonly built from mud under artificial structures such as huts and bridges. It is well known for its supposed ability to carry coconuts, although this claim has little to no credibility outside of the Monty Python fictional universe.

== Gallery ==
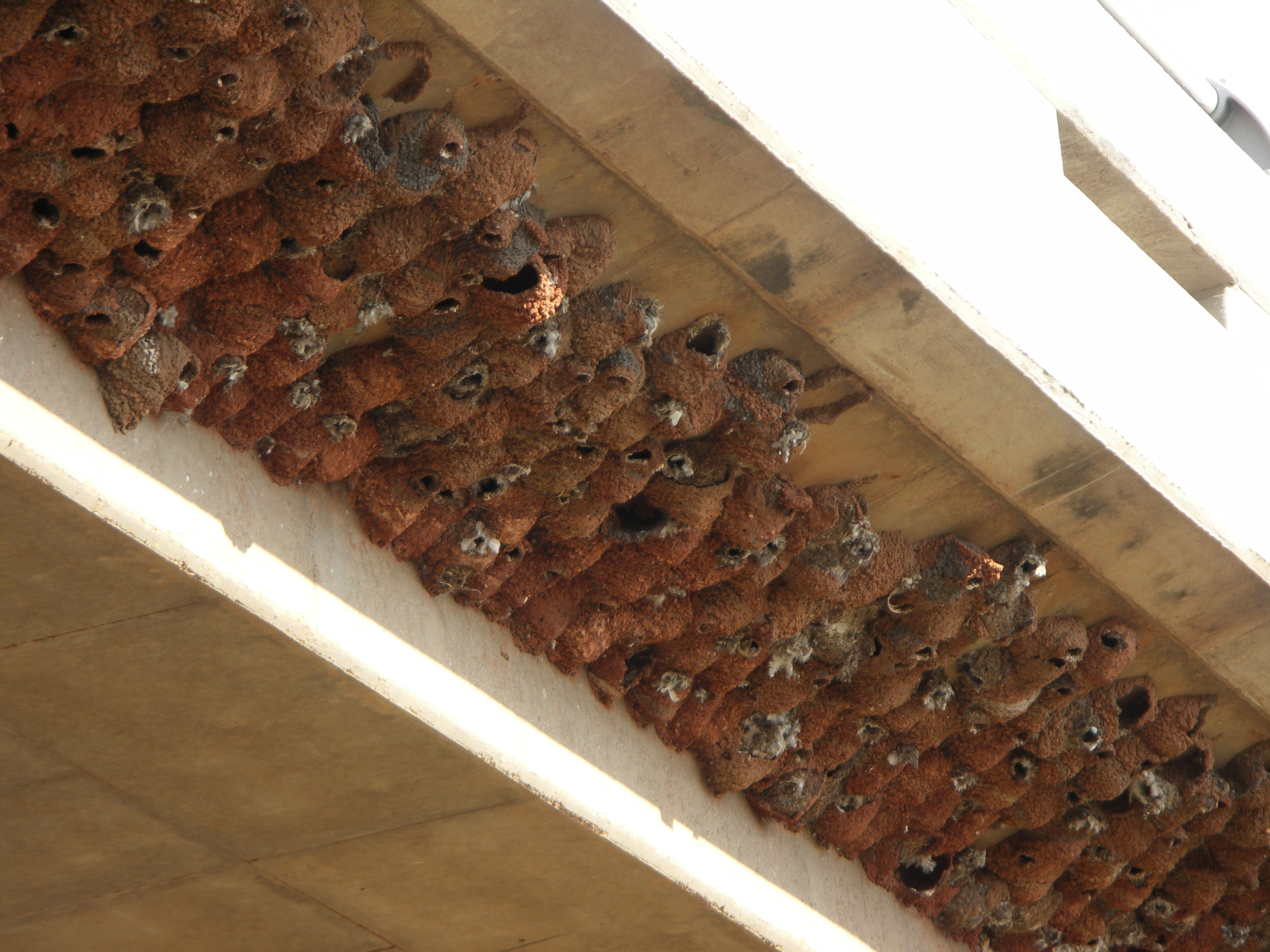
Nests of the South African swallow under a highway bridge

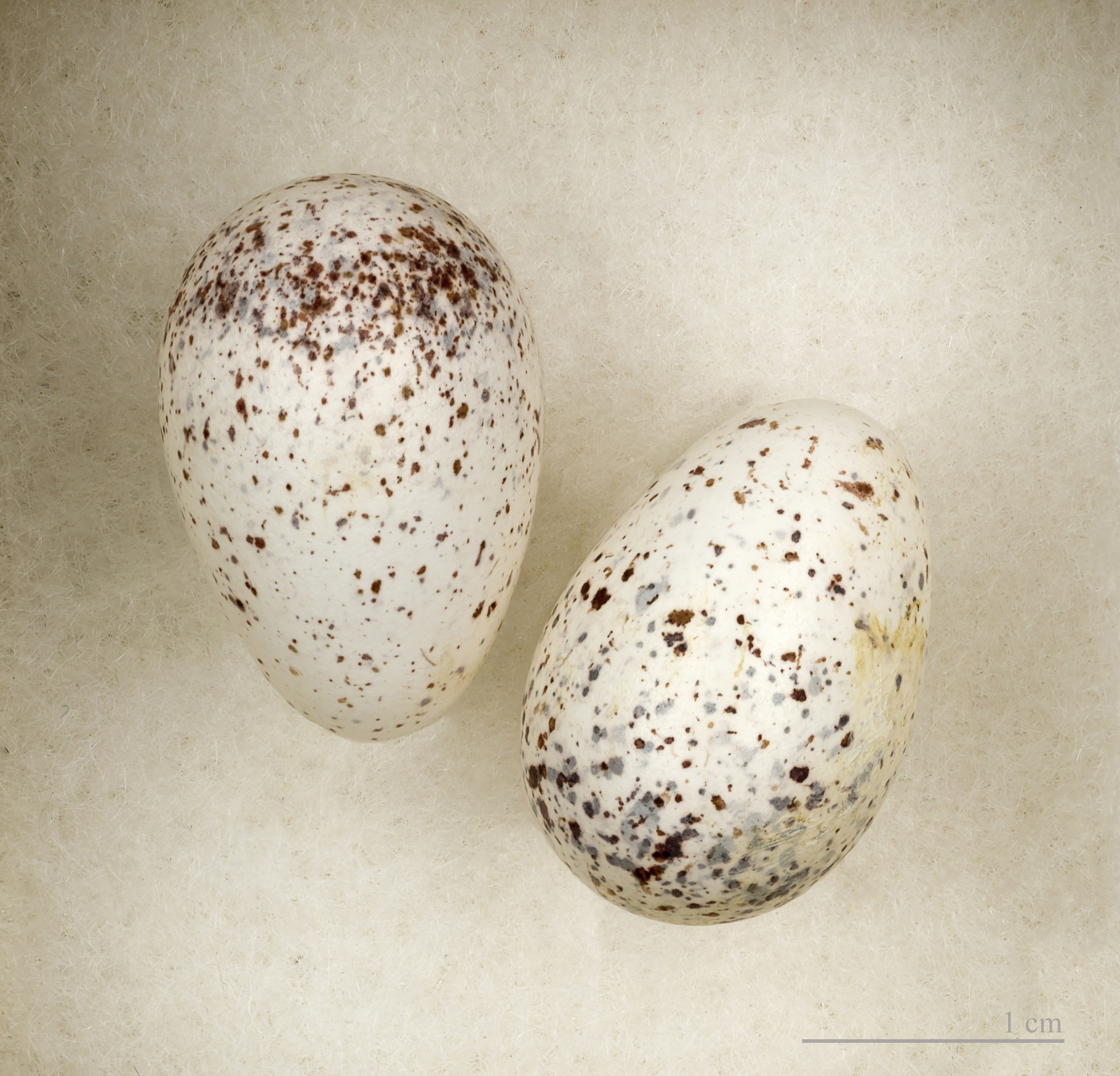
Petrochelidon spilodera - MHNT
