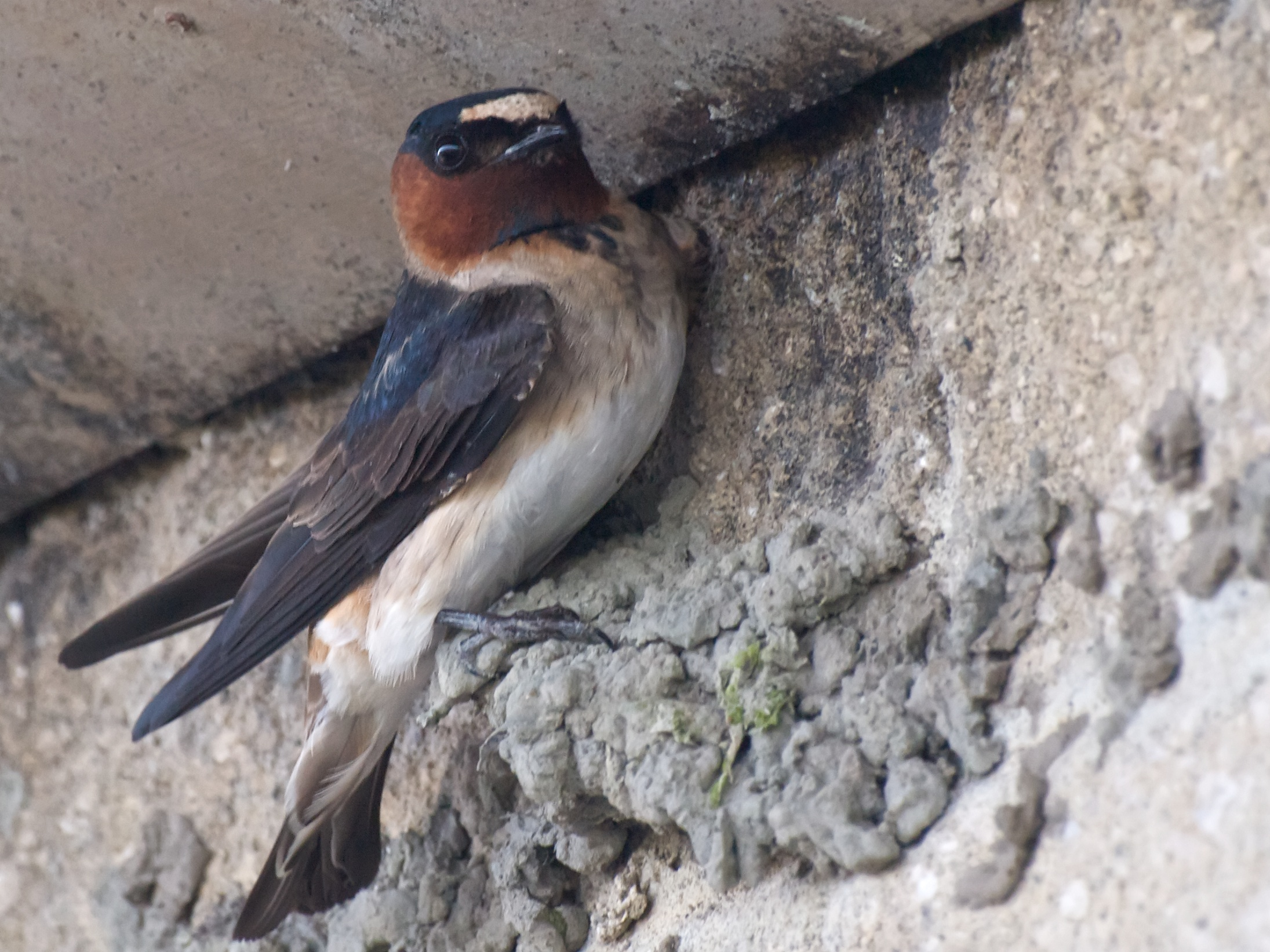
- An American cliff swallow starting to build a mud nest under the eaves of a building in California

Scientific classification
- Kingdom: Animalia
- Phylum: Chordata
- Class: Aves
- Order: Passeriformes
- Family: Hirundinidae
- Genus: Petrochelidon; Cabanis, 1851

Type species
- Hirundo melanogaster Swainson, 1827

Species
- 10, See text

= Petrochelidon =

Genus of birds

Petrochelidon is a genus of birds known as cliff-nesting swallows.

== Taxonomy ==
The genus Petrochelidon was introduced in 1851 by the German ornithologist Jean Cabanis. He listed several species in the new genus but did not specify the type species. In 1855 the English zoologist George Gray designated the type as Hirundo melanogaster Swainson. This taxon is now treated as a subspecies of the American cliff swallow (Petrochelidon pyrrhonota melanogaster). The genus name Petrochelidon is from the Greek words petra, "rock", and khelidon, "swallow".

The genus includes all five species commonly called cliff swallow. The genus contains ten species:

Image	Common name	Scientific name	Distribution
	American cliff swallow	Petrochelidon pyrrhonota	Canada and the United States of America, South American countries, such as Southern Brazil, Uruguay, and parts of Argentina.
	Cave swallow	Petrochelidon fulva	south-eastern New Mexico, Texas, Florida, the Greater Antilles, portions of southern Mexico, and along the west coast of South America.
	Chestnut-collared swallow	Petrochelidon rufocollaris	Ecuador and Peru.
	Preuss's cliff swallow	Petrochelidon preussi	Benin, Burkina Faso, Cameroon, Central African Republic, Chad, Republic of the Congo, Ivory Coast, Equatorial Guinea, Ghana, Guinea, Guinea-Bissau, Mali, Niger, Nigeria, Sierra Leone, and Togo.
	Red-throated cliff swallow	Petrochelidon rufigula	Angola, Republic of the Congo, DRC, Gabon, and Zambia.
	Red Sea cliff swallow	Petrochelidon perdita	Sudan.
	South African cliff swallow	Petrochelidon spilodera	Botswana, Republic of the Congo, Democratic Republic of the Congo, Gabon, Lesotho, Malawi, Namibia, South Africa, Zambia, and Zimbabwe.
	Streak-throated swallow	Petrochelidon fluvicola	Afghanistan, Bangladesh, India, Nepal and Pakistan.
	Fairy martin	Petrochelidon ariel	Australia, with some birds reaching New Guinea and Indonesia.
	Tree martin	Petrochelidon nigricans	Australia, New Guinea, Indonesia east of the Wallace Line and the Solomon Islands.
