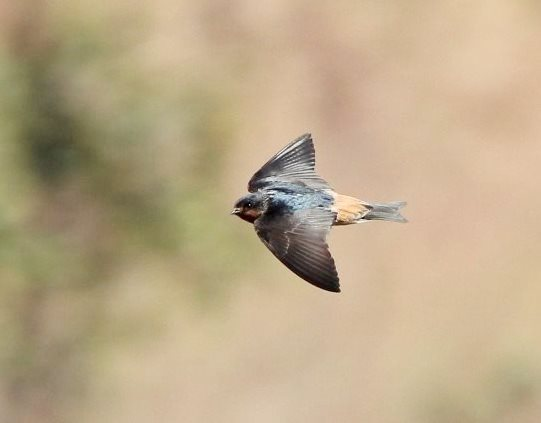
- in Angola

Conservation status
- Least Concern (IUCN 3.1)

Scientific classification
- Kingdom: Animalia
- Phylum: Chordata
- Class: Aves
- Order: Passeriformes
- Family: Hirundinidae
- Genus: Petrochelidon
- Species: P. rufigula

Binomial name
- Petrochelidon rufigula (Barboza du Bocage, 1878)

Synonyms
- Hirundo rufigula

= Red-throated cliff swallow =

Species of bird

The red-throated cliff swallow (Petrochelidon rufigula), also known as the red-throated swallow, is a species of bird in the family Hirundinidae. It is found in Angola, Republic of the Congo, DRC, Gabon, and Zambia.

== Gallery ==
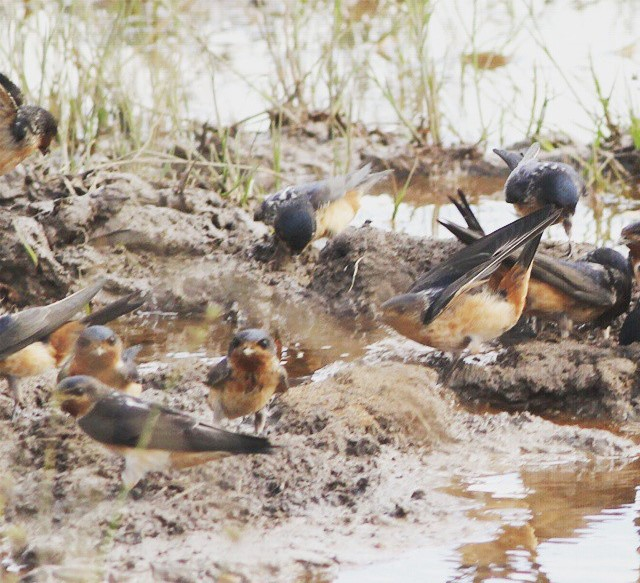
Breeding colony collecting mud pellets for nesting, Angola

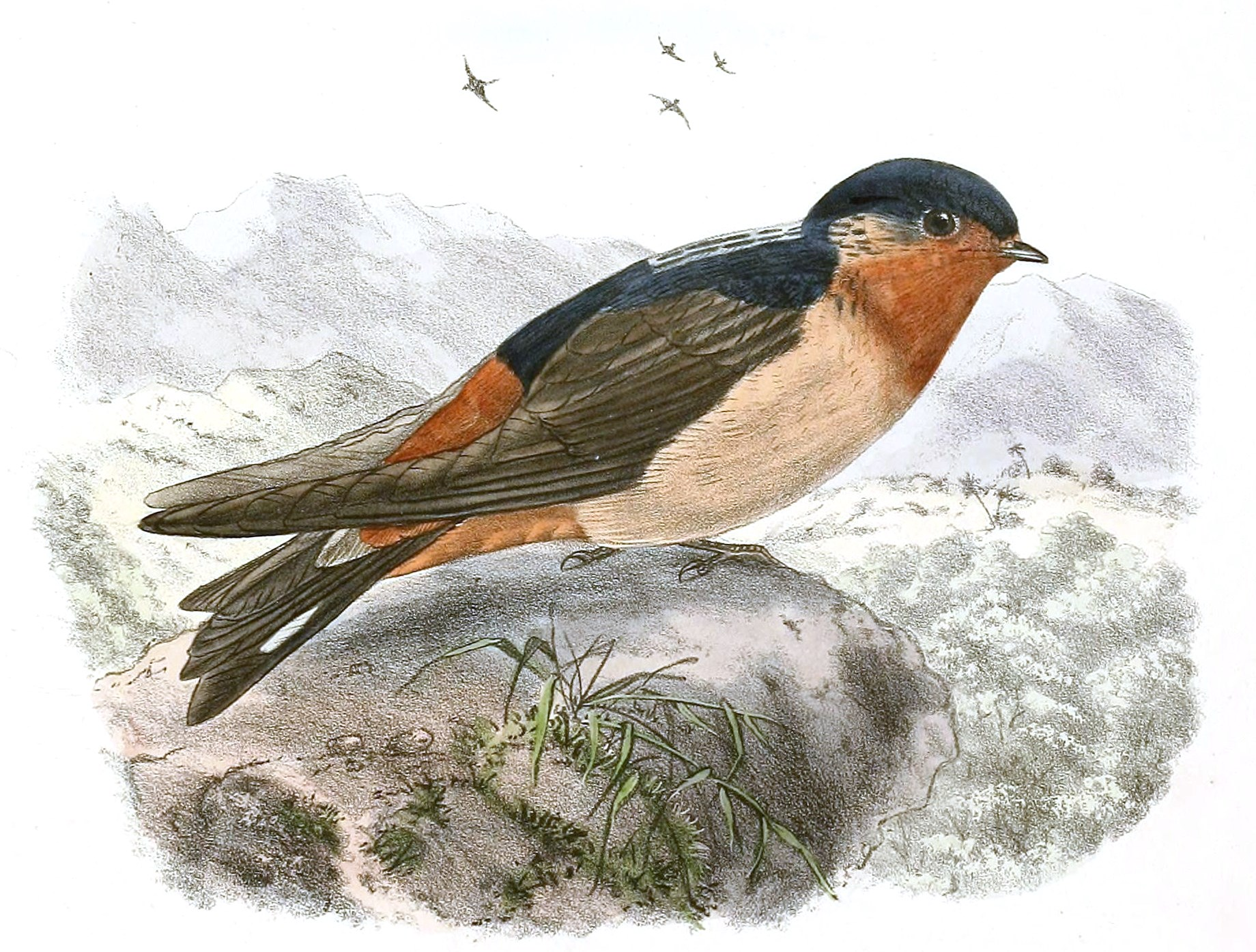
Illustration by R. B. Sharpe

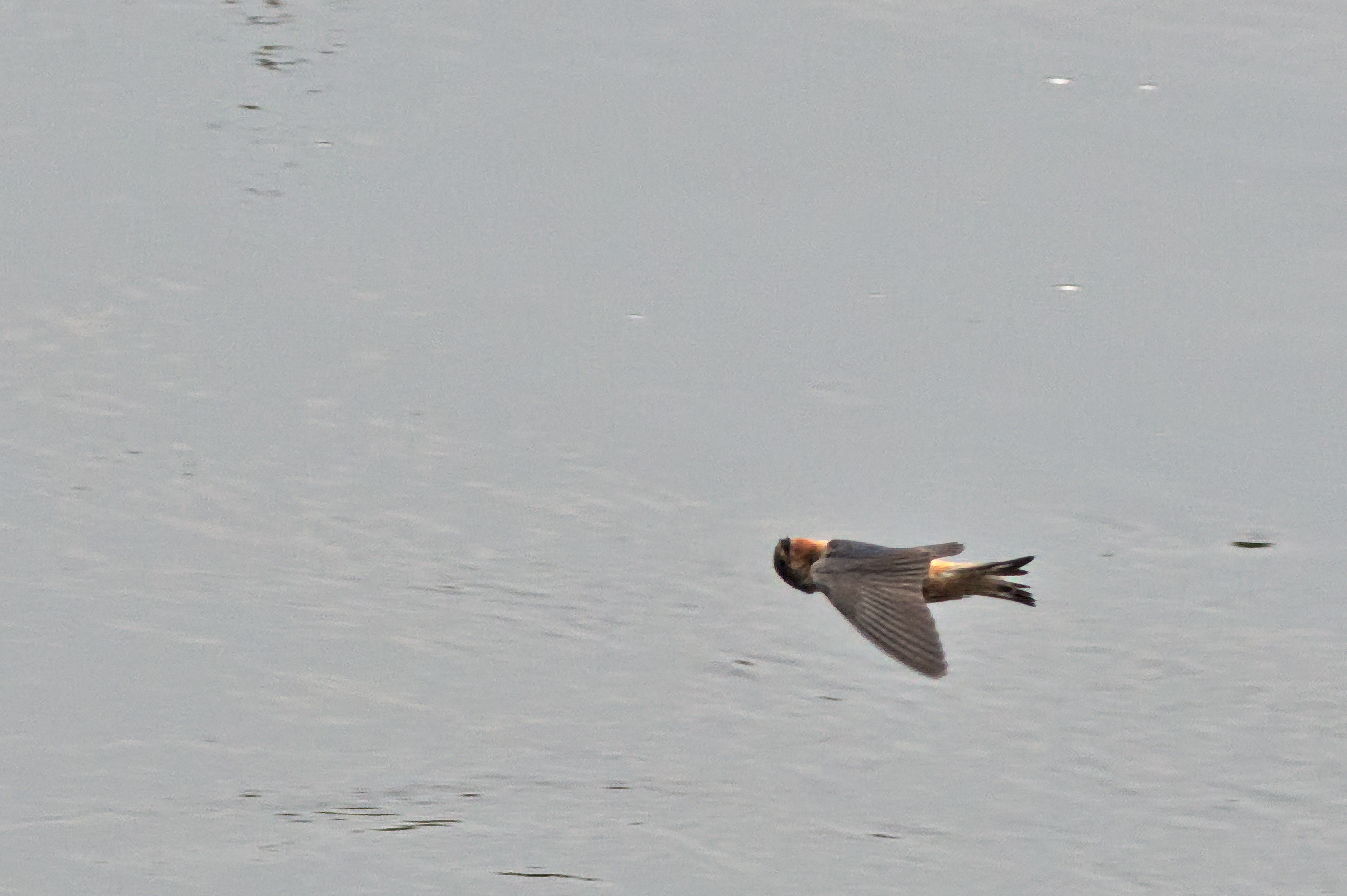
Red-throated Cliff Swallow flying on its back
