= Cala Comte =

Beach on Ibiza, Spain

- Beach
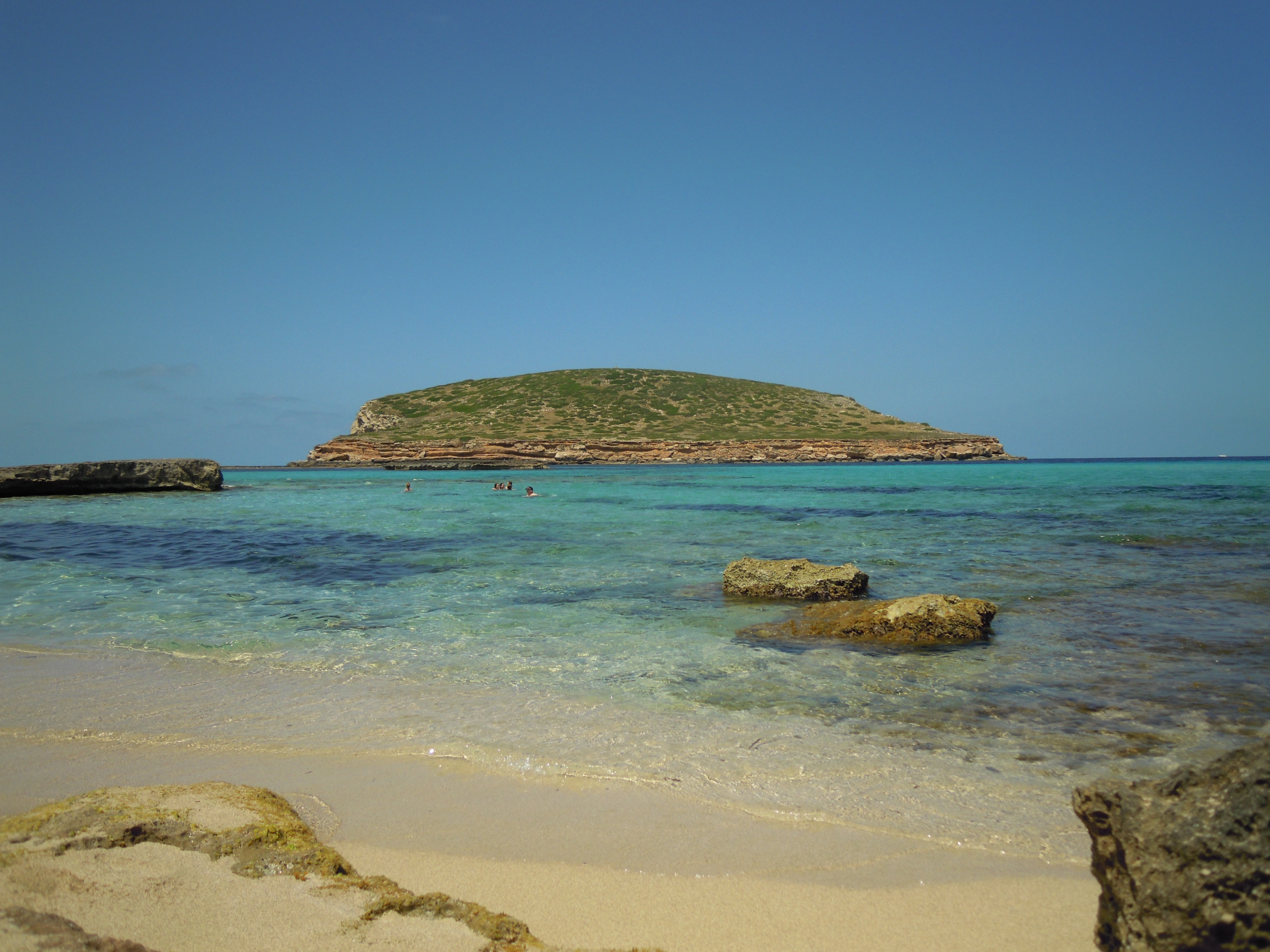
- Cala Comte

- Location of Cala Comte on Ibiza
- Coordinates: 38°57′45″N 1°13′13″E
- Location: Sant Josep de sa Talaia, Balearic Islands, Spain

Cala Comte is a beach in the south west of the Spanish island of Ibiza. It is in the municipality of Sant Josep de sa Talaia and is 5.0 miles (8.0 km) west of the village of Sant Agustí des Vedrà.

== Description ==
The beach of Cala Comte is a small sandy beach with several small coves near by. The beach has shallow clear blue and turquoise water which is kept that way by the constant flow of sea currents in the area. From the beach there are views of the small islands of S’Espartar Illa des Bosc and Sa Conillera. The beach to the western side of the rocky headland is popular with families, whilst the beach to the eastern side is an unofficial nudist spot.

Cala Comte, also known in Spanish as Cala Conta and in Catalan as Platges de Comte, is an iconic beach located in the southwest of Ibiza. Its name bears historical significance, stemming from Nuño Sánchez, Count of Sardinia and Roussillon, who played a role in the island's conquest in 1234. Comte translates to "Count" in English, linking the beach's name to this noble figure. Specifically, the name refers to the two adjacent beaches: Platja de Tramuntana, which faces north, and Platja de Ponent, which faces west. Collectively, these are known as Platges de Comte, or "Count's Beaches" in English.

== Facilities ==
Located on the crown of the small headland, there is a restaurant and shop along with toilet facilities. From the headland there are views across to several small islands. During the summer months the beach is patrolled by lifeguards. Behind the headland on the cliff tops there is a car park which becomes extremely busy in the summer.

=== Blue Flag ===
In 2010 Cala Conte was one of the fifteen beaches on the island to have been awarded a prestigious Blue Flag.

== Location ==
The beach is in the municipality of Sant Josep de sa Talaia but the nearest large island resort is Sant Antoni. To get to the beach from Sant Antoni there are several options. It is a well signposted drive with brown tourist signs from the EI-700 road at the nearby village of Sant Agustí des Vedrà. There is also a frequent bus service in the summer from both Sant Antoni and Ibiza town. There are also regular ferry boat departures regularly San Antonio harbour and various hotels along the Sant Antoni Bay during the summer months to the beach.

== Gallery ==
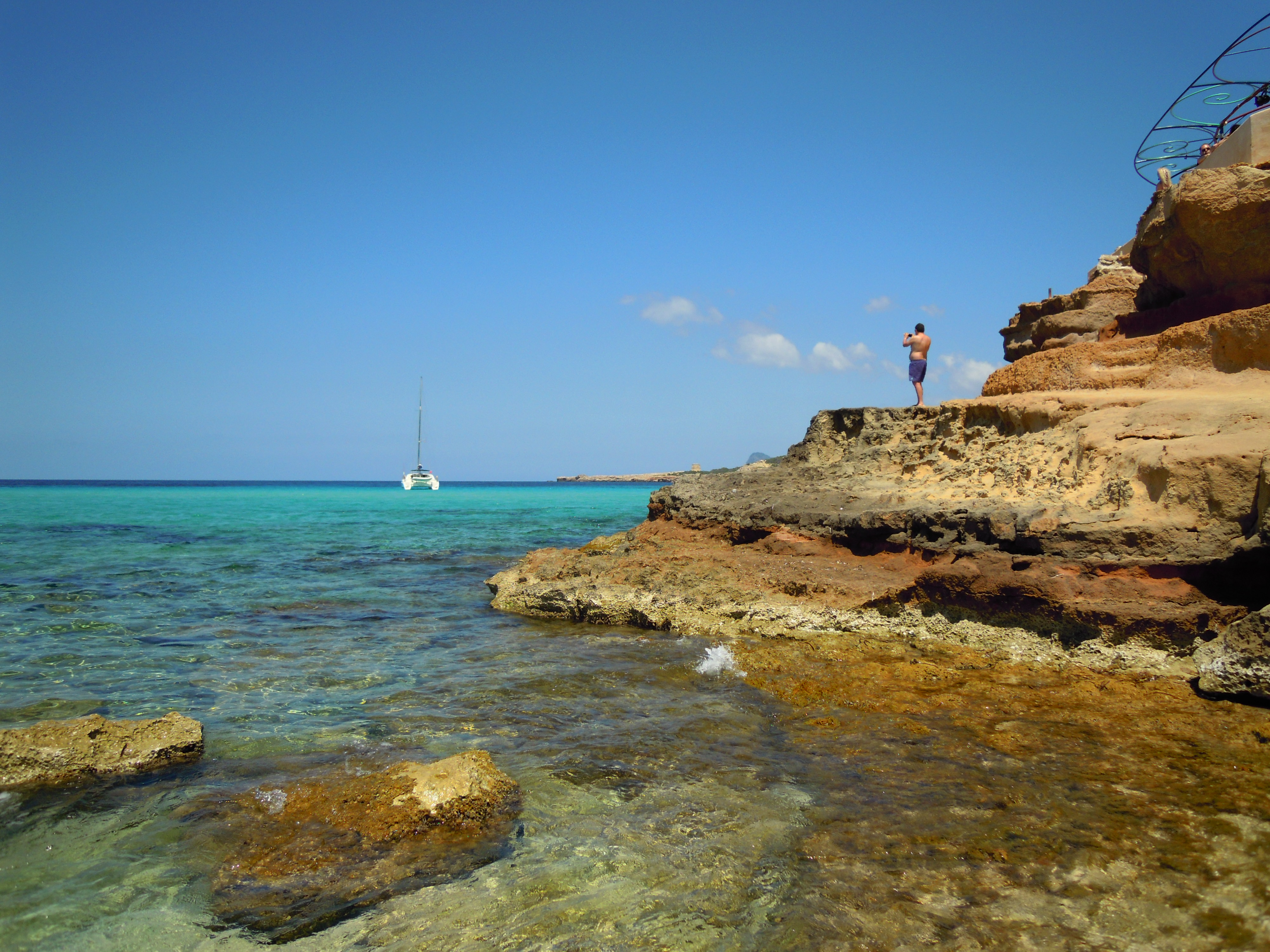

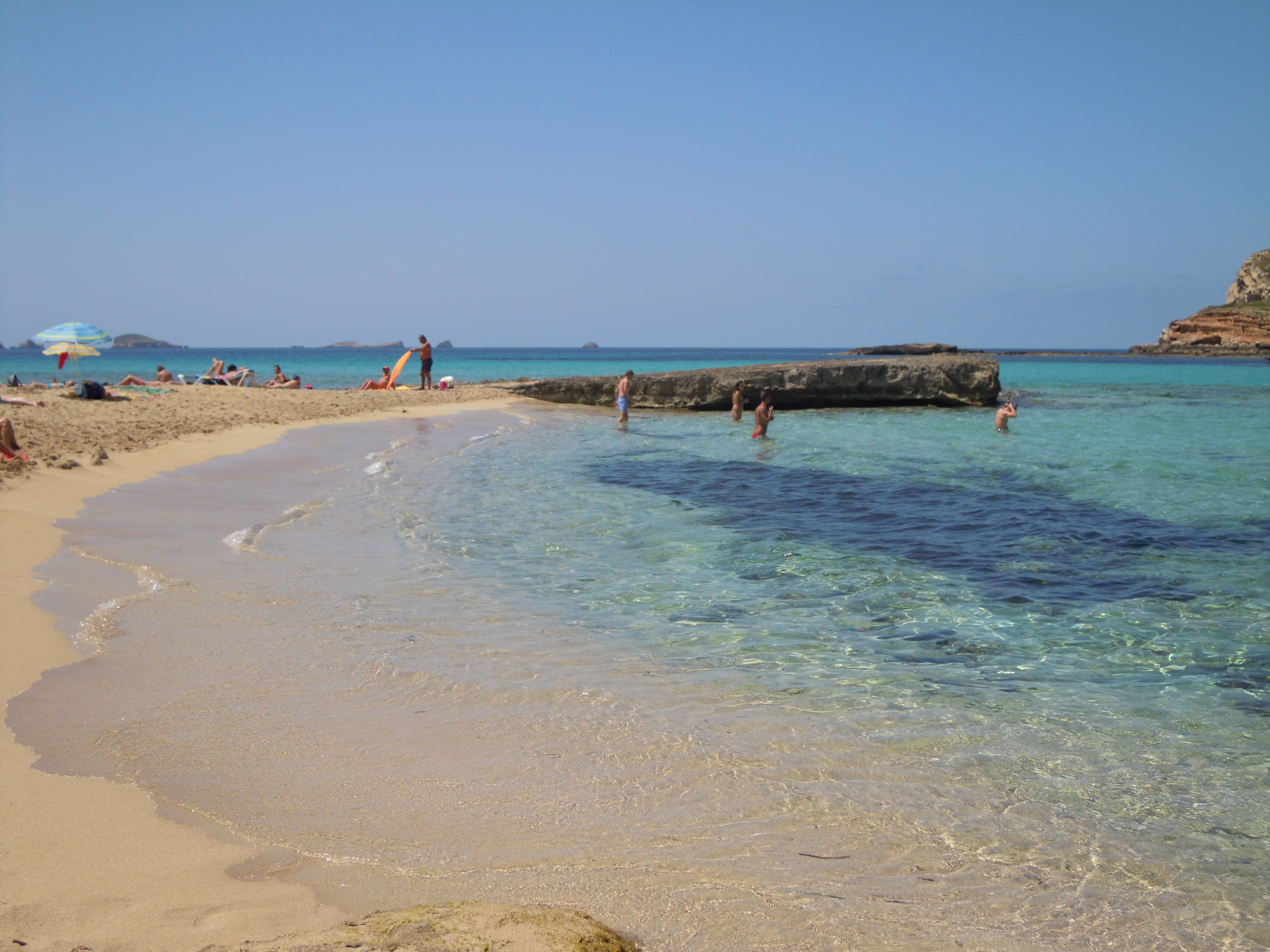

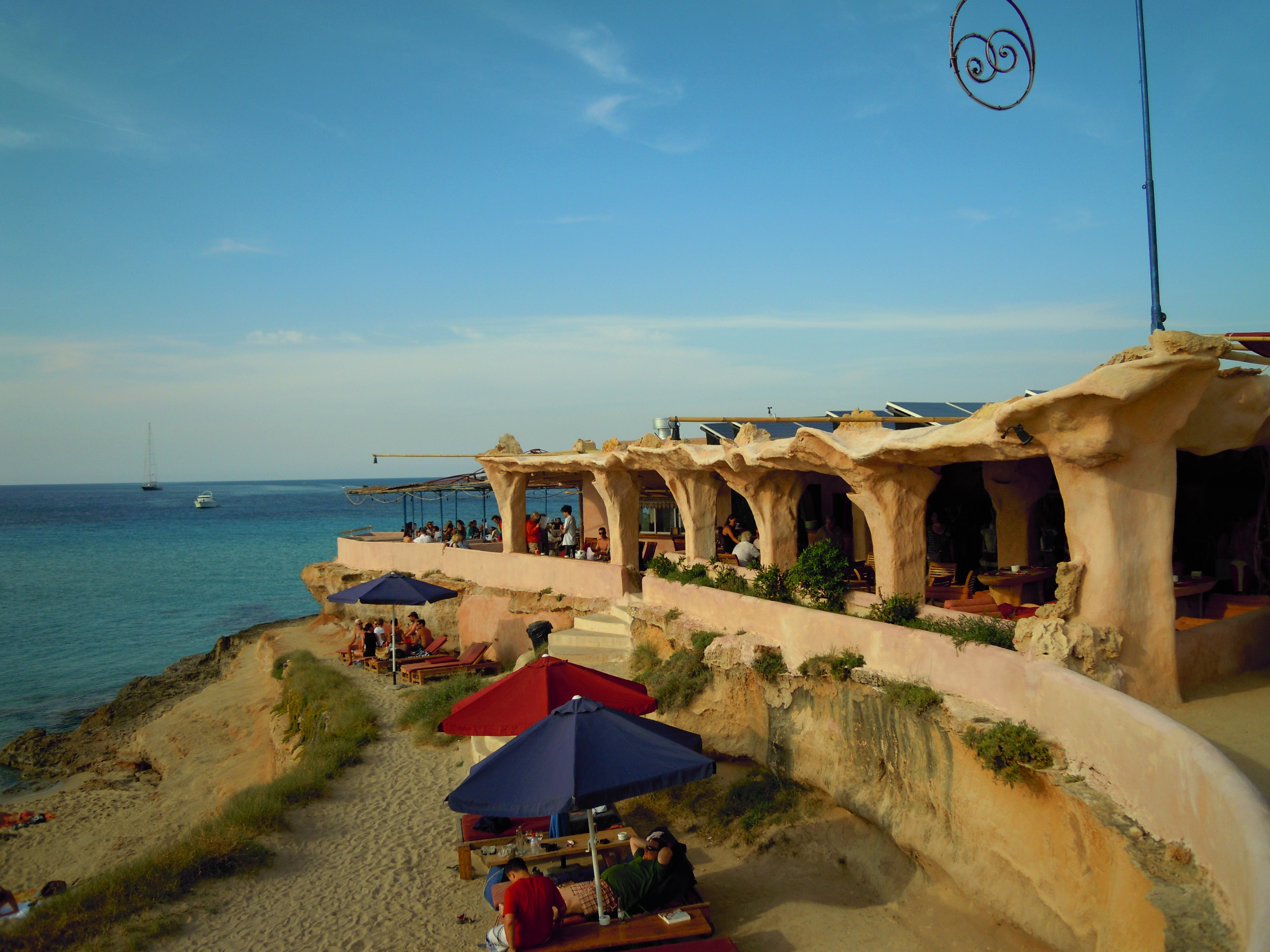

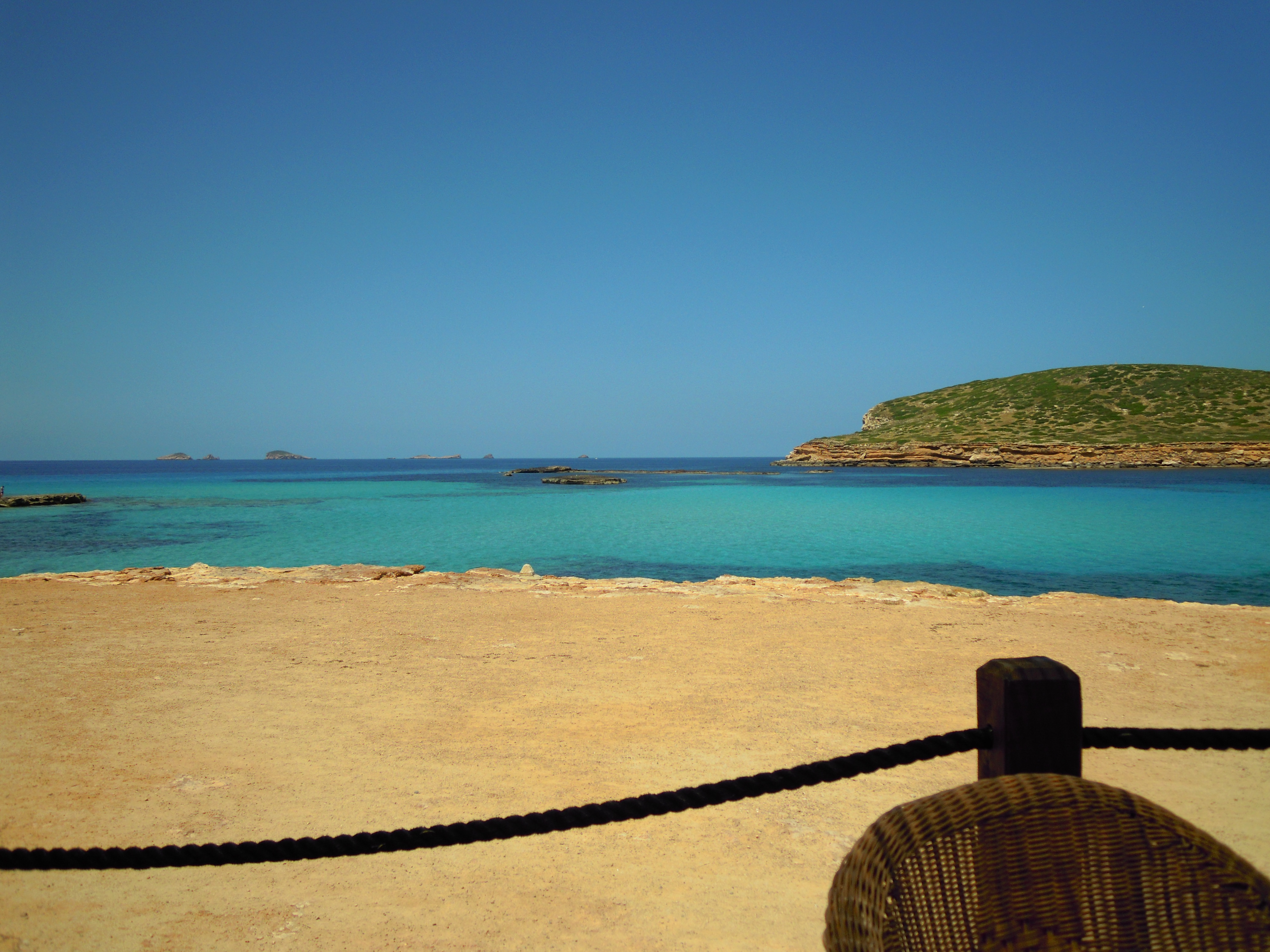

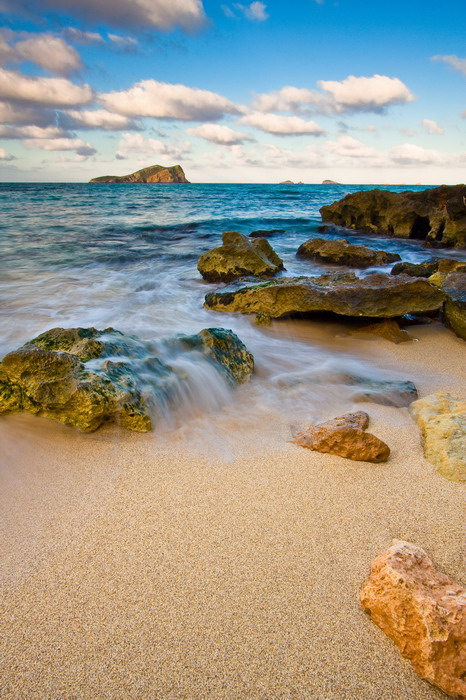
