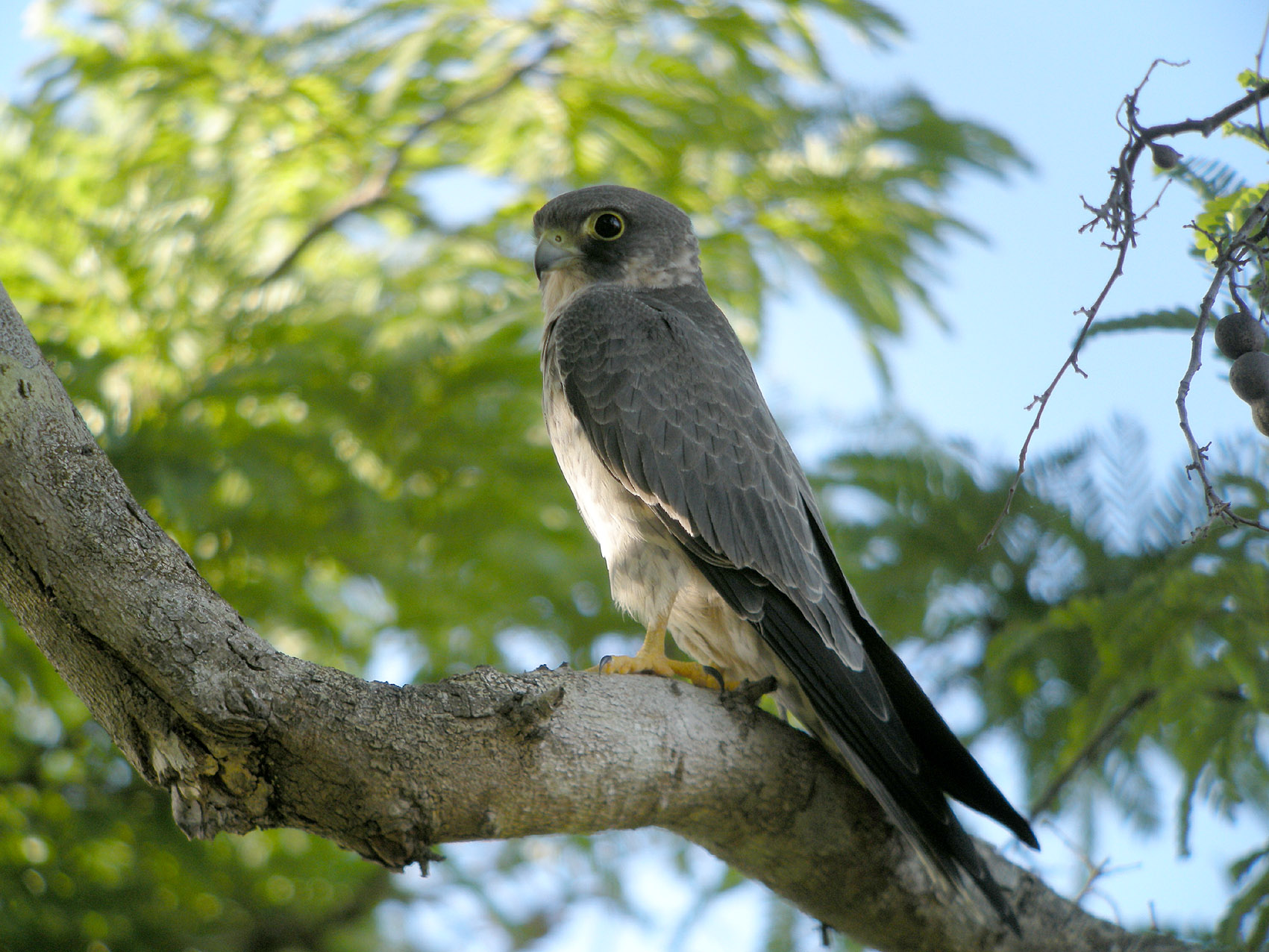
- Allée Des Baobabs near Morondava, Madagascar

Conservation status
- Vulnerable (IUCN 3.1)

Scientific classification
- Kingdom: Animalia
- Phylum: Chordata
- Class: Aves
- Order: Falconiformes
- Family: Falconidae
- Genus: Falco
- Subgenus: Falco
- Species: F. concolor

Binomial name
- Falco concolor Temminck, 1825
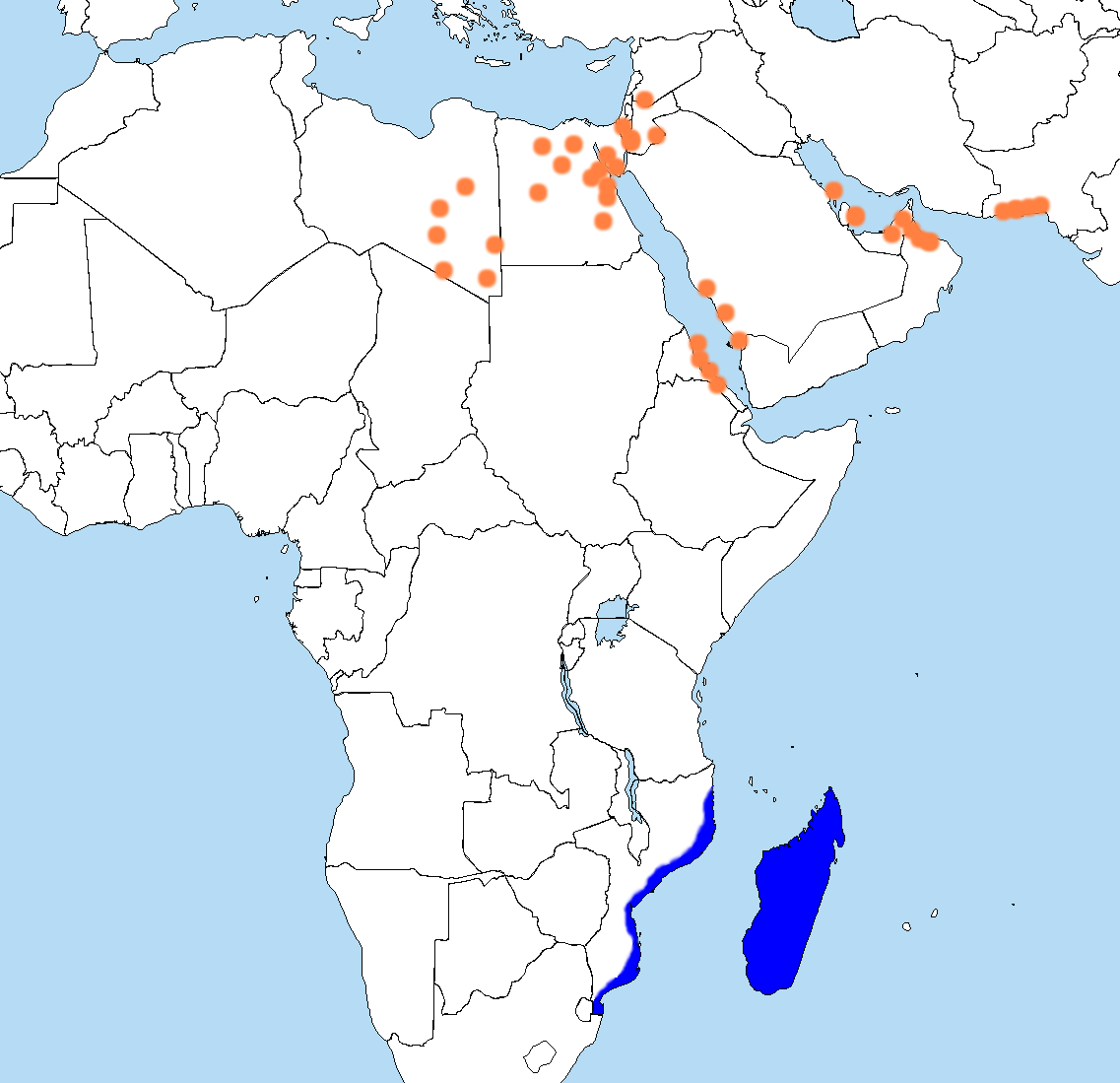
- Global range. Orange dots: Breeding colonies Blue: Wintering range

= Sooty falcon =

Species of bird

The sooty falcon (Falco concolor) is a medium-sized falcon, breeding from northeastern Africa to the southern Persian Gulf region, and wintering in East Africa (Mozambique, eastern South Africa) and Madagascar.

== Taxonomy ==
The Sooty Falcon is part of the order Falconiformes, family Falconidae and genus Falco. The sooty falcon belongs to the hobby group, a rather close-knit number of similar falcons often considered a subgenus Falco. Eleonora's falcon F. eleonorae is sometimes considered its closest relative, but while they certainly belong to the same clade, they may not be direct sister species, with F. concolor possibly closer to Eurasian hobby F. subbuteo and African hobby F. cuvieri than it is to Eleonora's falcon.

== Description ==
This is an elegant bird of prey, 32–37 cm long with a 78–90 cm wingspan. It is shaped like a large Eurasian hobby or a small Eleonora's falcon, with its long pointed wings, long tail and slim body. The adults are blue-grey, and lack the black underwing coverts of the Eleonora's falcon. The young bird is like a large juvenile hobby, or small juvenile Eleanora's falcon. Its dark trailing edge to the wings and tail distinguish it from the former species, and it lacks the underwing contrast caused by the dark coverts of the larger falcon.

== Distribution and habitat ==
This species is distributed across Southwest Asia and North Africa. It breeds on islands and coastal or desert cliffs from Libya to Pakistan). It is a long-distance migrant, wintering in east Africa and south to Madagascar and south-eastern South Africa. Increasingly regular sightings and a lack of historical records suggests that the wintering range has expanded south in recent decades. It is a rare vagrant north of its breeding range.

== Ecology ==
=== Diet ===
In the breeding season, sooty falcons almost exclusively eat migrating birds (mostly passerines but also swifts, hoopoes, and others), as there are very few resident birds in its desert habitat. It will also take bats and large insects, such as dragonflies, which are transferred from talons to beak and eaten in flight. In winter, large insects form a far higher proportion of the diet. They have also been known to eat lizards and crabs.

=== Hunting behaviour ===
During winter the falcons hunt alone, in groups or even as flocks of up to 15 individuals. These hunting flocks tend to perch on trees and feed on swarming insects. During the breeding, summer, season males do the majority of the hunting. Four hunting techniques are employed:

- Diving from a perch. The falcons spot prey from their perch and then dive down to catch it.
- Flushing. Flushing is a technique used in which individual falcons fly low over bushes or trees in an attempts to flush other birds out, after which they catch them.
- Flying up to come down. When a falcon spots a flying prey bird they try to fly further above it, and then dive down to intercept the prey.
- Survey flight. Individuals circle areas at great heights in hopes of spotting a prey item. Once prey is spotted the falcon flies down below the prey, and then turns back up into the prey's flight path to catch it.

=== Nesting and breeding behaviour ===
Sooty Falcons lay eggs during mid-summer, like Eleonora's falcon but unlike most other falcons, and occasionally nest in colonies. The falcons breed in the arid deserts of Southwest Asia and North Africa during the summer months, which is remarkable due to high summer temperatures. They breed in three types of arid environment: (1) small islands in the Red Sea, (2) mountainous deserts and (3) in deserts with rocky outcrops. It nests on a ledge or on rocks, laying up to four eggs. While the falcons tend to nest on high cliffs, they have also been found nesting between rocks or on the ground. Nests are scraped into soft limestone, chalk or sandstone cliffs, and face away from the sun to provide shelter from its rays. Nest also function as perches from which defense against predators is mounted.

Birds begin to display and mate during April and May, with eggs being laid by July-August. Egg incubation lasts approximately 27-29 days. Incubation is predominantly performed by the female, while the male only taking shifts for 1-7 minutes while the female sunbathes. Males hunt and bring food to the female and chicks once they have hatched. During the incubation period males provide females with 3-4 birds per day. Excess food is cached on shaded ledges outside the nest. Doing this ensures that food is regulated and that it is available when it is scarce. It also keeps the nests clean, and prevents parasites and pests from being attracted to the nests. The young falcons remain in the nest for 32-38 days, after which they still remain near the nest for a further 2-3 weeks. During this period the parents still take care of them, but thereafter the level of parental care begins to decrease.

Birds nesting on islands in the Sea of Oman have a mean clutch size of 2.83 and brood size of 2.11, with 12% of nests failing at the egg or nesting stage.

=== Migration ===
The falcons migrate from their breeding grounds in Southwest Asia and North Africa to winter in Eastern and South-eastern Africa. The journey takes approximately 13 days and covers a distance of 5500 kilometres. The falcons start their migration during the night but tend to travel only during the day. They stop-over at rest spots along Eastern Africa, spots where there are potential water sources.

== Conservation ==
It was formerly classified as Least Concern by the IUCN, but has recently been shown to be rarer than formerly believed. Consequently, it was uplisted to Vulnerable status in 2017. It is estimated that their population ranges between 2800 and 4000 individuals and that these numbers are declining. The breeding population of Sooty falcons on the islands of northern Oman is in decline, with human disturbance on accessible islands a likely cause, as falcons breeding close to beaches have lower nesting success than those breeding further away. Hence, mitigating human disturbances and protecting natural habitats is of critical conservation concern to the Sooty Falcon.
