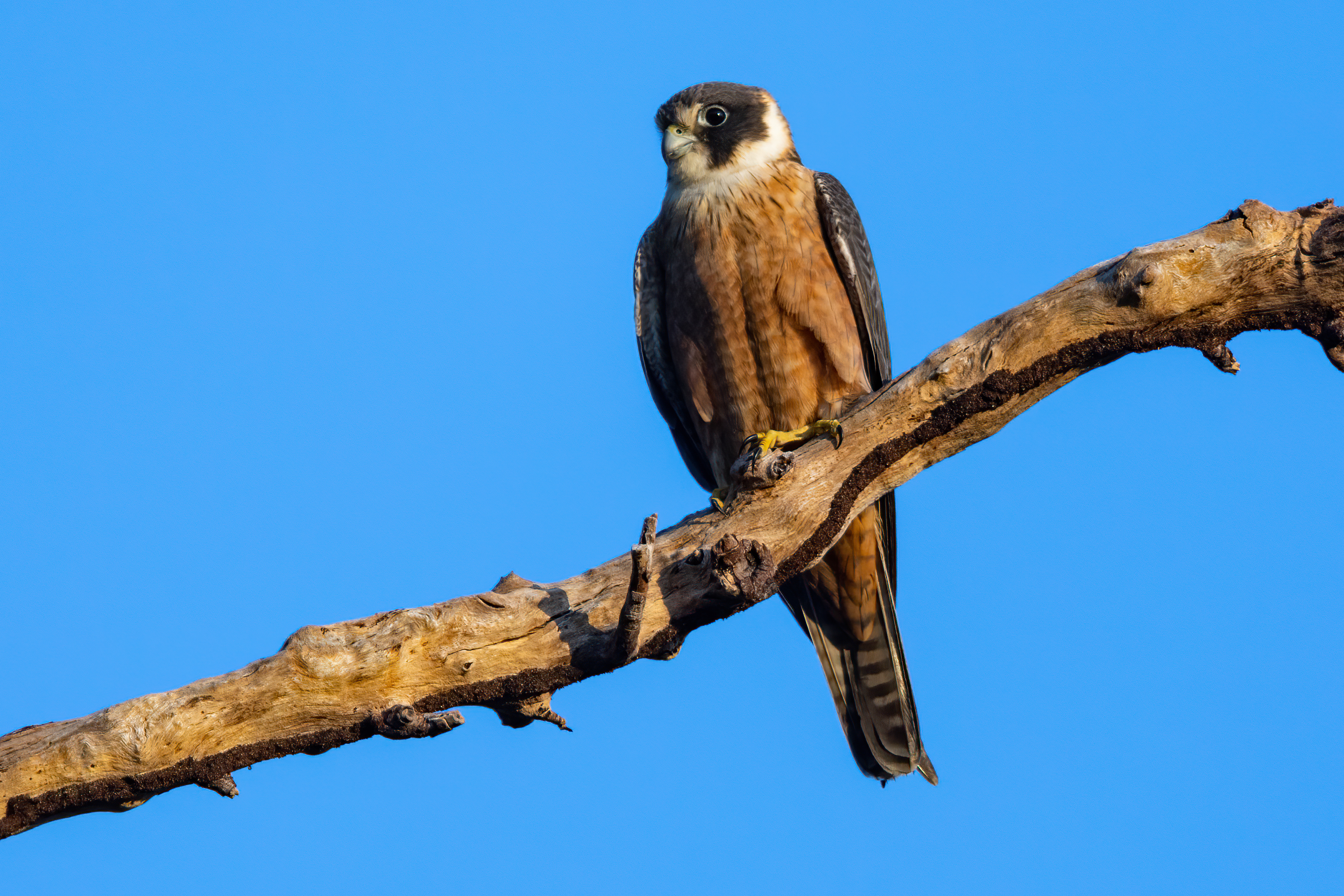

Conservation status
- Least Concern (IUCN 3.1)

Scientific classification
- Kingdom: Animalia
- Phylum: Chordata
- Class: Aves
- Order: Falconiformes
- Family: Falconidae
- Genus: Falco
- Subgenus: Falco
- Species: F. longipennis

Binomial name
- Falco longipennis Swainson, 1838

= Australian hobby =

Species of bird

The Australian hobby (Falco longipennis), also known as the little falcon, is one of six Australian members of the family Falconidae. This predominantly diurnal bird of prey derives its name 'longipennis' from its long primary wing feathers. It occurs throughout Australia and other neighbouring countries with migrating individuals found on the islands of Indonesia and New Guinea.

== Taxonomy ==
The Australian hobby is a member of the family Falconidae and the order Falconiformes. Five major clades have been established in the genus Falco. These include kestrels, merlins, hobbies, hierofalcons and peregrines. Hobbies are somewhat removed from these groups but are still a component of a more inclusive clade.

Three subspecies of Australian hobby are usually recognised. These are:

- Falco longipennis longipennis, (Swainson, 1838)
- Falco longipennis hanieli (Hellmayr, 1914) being slightly smaller and paler below than F. l. longipennis
- Falco longipennis murchisonianus (Mathews, 1912) is paler blue-grey above with a dull blackish head, and paler reddish-brown below with less distinct markings.

Of the hobbies in existence including the African hobby (Falco cuvierii) and the Oriental hobby (Falco severus), the Australian hobby is closely related to the Eurasian hobby (Falco subbuteo) which inhabits Eurasia and migrates to Africa during winter.

== Description ==
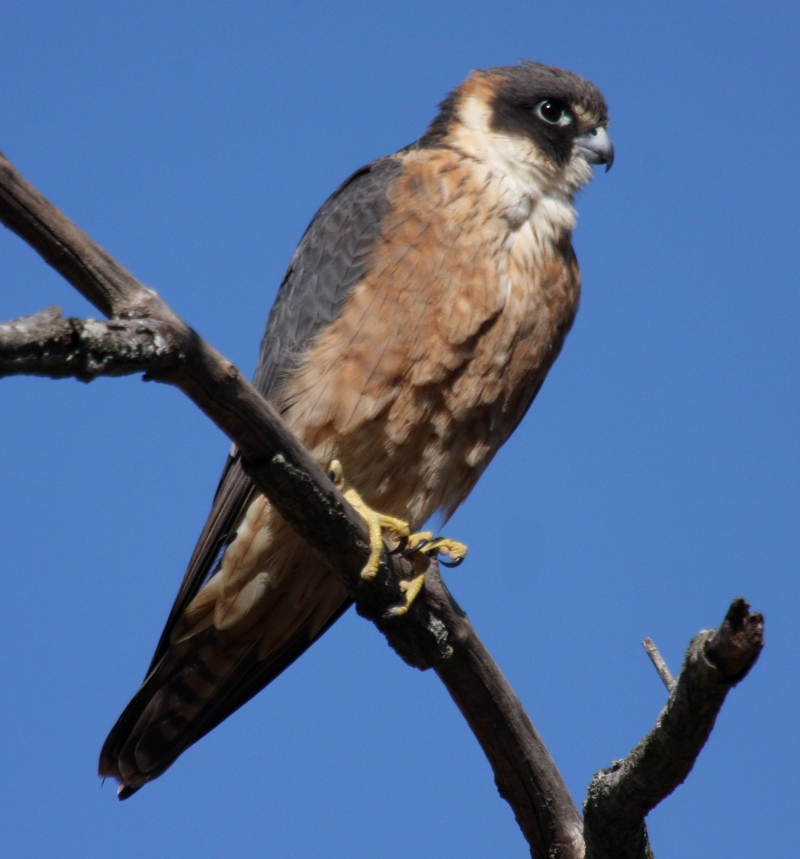
Samsonvale Cemetery, SE Queensland

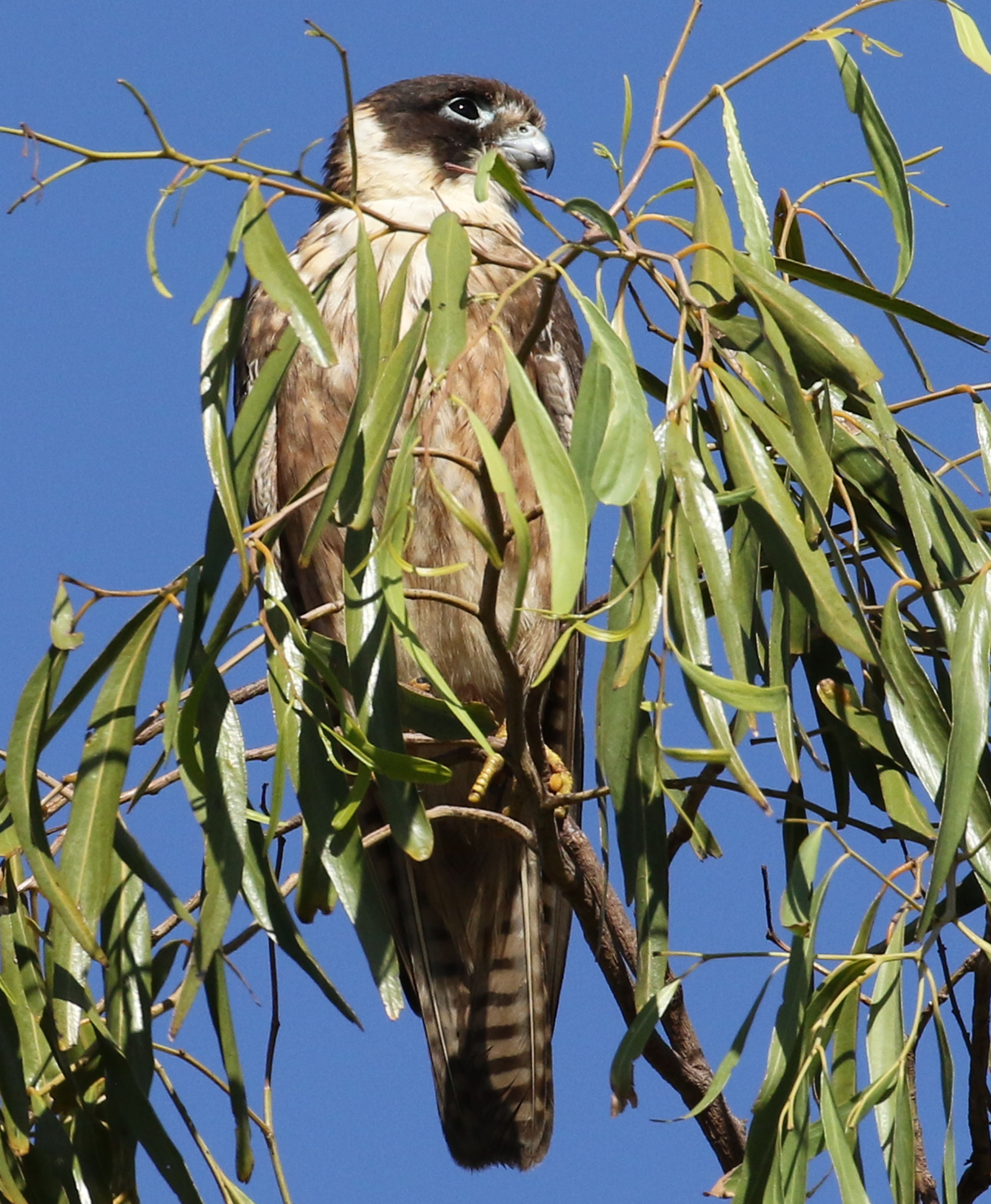
Australian Hobby, Broome, Western Australia

Smaller than other falcons, the Australian hobby is relatively slender and long winged. Its plumage varies in colour depending on sex, age and environment with a darker form in humid areas and a lighter form in drier environments. Generally the hobby displays a black cap and mask with a whitish forehead and half-collar. Underparts can be blue-grey or rufous and streaked darker. The cere in adults is a pale yellowish grey, the eye ring is pale blue, the eyes are brown and the feet are dull yellow. Females are larger in size between 34 and 35.5 cm and males are generally between 30 and 32 cm in length with a wing span between 66 and 87 cm. The Australian hobby is easily confused with the peregrine falcon (Falco peregrinus) however the hobby is more slender, with longer and thinner wings, and is a less powerful flyer.

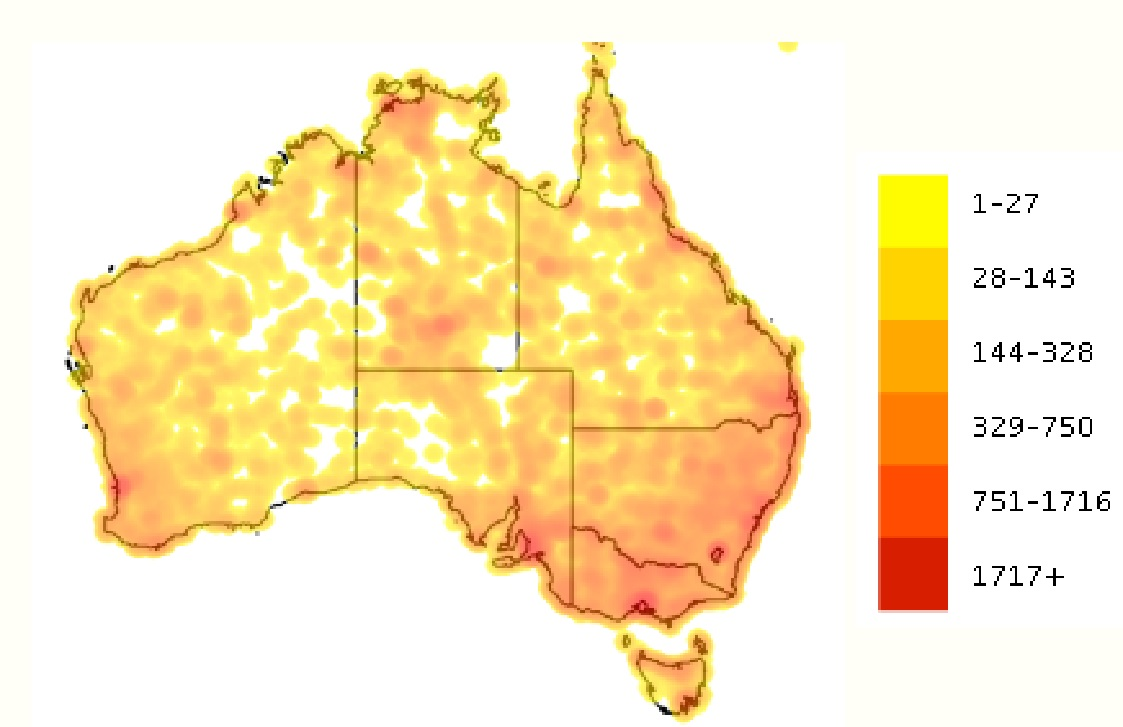
Distribution and density of the Australian hobby from occurrence records

== Distribution and habitat ==
Hobbies occur throughout mainland Australia including offshore islands e.g. Lord Howe Island, however their range is restricted in Tasmania. Migrating individuals have also been recorded on the islands of Indonesia and New Guinea. Hobbies frequent most open habitats including open woodland, water courses and vegetated urban areas but are rarely recorded around cliffs or escarpments.

== Diet ==
The Australian hobby has been recorded preying on avian species including the European starling (Sturnus vulgaris), house sparrow (Passer domesticus), crimson rosella (Platycercus elegans) and silvereye (Zosterops lateralis). Research suggests they tend to avoid large, dangerous, or agile species that forage close to cover, such as the common myna (Acridotheres tristis). Insectivorous bats and insects including beetles, cicadas, crickets and grasshoppers also form part of the hobby's diet.

== Behaviour ==
=== Flight ===
The hobby is a solitary and aggressive falcon using rapid flickering wing beats, with tail fanned when hovering. It glides on flat or slightly drooped wings with carpals flexed and outerwings swept back. Its flight is often characterised as low and fast, zig-zagging over or between vegetation and open ground. When engaged in territorial defence, hobbies have been observed soaring and circling to ward off other birds of prey e.g. little eagle (Hieraaetus morphnoides). Hobbies have also been observed attacking other perched raptors with steep stoops at vegetation and shallow stoops from behind for airborne raptors.

=== Hunting ===
The hobby is a widespread and common hunter that often hunts at dusk, diurnally and sometimes nocturnally by artificial light. Hobbies have been witnessed catching their prey in mid air, by direct attack from a perch or in fast contour-flying above or between tree canopies. It is acrobatic in the pursuit of prey and attacks fleeing birds in a series of short shallow stoops. They have also been recorded using a concealed approach when attacking shorebird roosts, flying towards them behind the cover of dunes, cliffs or trees. Hobbies have been known to harass larger birds but are not capable of killing them. Research has shown that Australian hobbies have one of the lowest prey-to-predator ratios (i.e., smaller prey relative to their body mass) because of the large number of insects in their diet.

=== Breeding ===
Nesting usually occurs any time between August and January where an old stick nest of another large raptor is commandeered. Three to four heavily blotched eggs are laid with incubation taking about 35 days. Successful broods usually comprise two to three young. The fledglings remain dependent for up to three months after which the young disperse or migrate widely. Studies have revealed the extent of the falcon's migration. In one case, a banded fledgling left its natal territory in Canberra, Australian Capital Territory, and was recovered 29 days later in Brisbane, Queensland, approximately 1000 km away. Within their nesting territory, hobbies have been recorded using several different perches for activities including, the transfer of food between male and female, for feeding independently and for guarding the nest. Research has shown that brooding is shared by both male and female hobbies. However, feeding of the nestlings after hatching becomes the responsibility of the female. Early on in the nestling period the male hunting rate increases to supplement the female, with observations indicating food is brought to the nest every three hours, with a longer break in the middle of the day.

=== Vocalisations ===
Research undertaken comparing the vocalisations of Australian falcons, found that two structurally distinct calls were emitted when a male hobby was restrained. This included a wide band harmonic vocalisation and a trill-type vocalisation. The trill-type vocalisation was given sporadically upon initial handling and harmonic vocalisation was assessed as the most common call of the species being used in situations of territorial defence and mobbing. Observations of hobbies during breeding identified that two main calls were used by adults. One was a rapid peevish chatter Kee-Kee-Kee-Kee-Kee which was given by the male as he brought prey to the nest area and was given by both sexes in alarm, when mobbing other predatory birds and when selecting and defending the nest. The second call resembled a squeaky chittering and ticking which appears to be used in a social dominance and food possession or food begging context. Juveniles were observed calling in an unslurred chittering whine when begging for food and in a chattering kee-kee-kee... when alarmed, or excited, from the feathering stage. Calls by the Australian hobby are similar, but higher pitched, to the male peregrine falcon (Falco peregrinus) when arriving at the nest with food. The hobby is also described as having similar alarm and contact calls to the nankeen kestrel (Falco cenchroides).

== Conservation and threats ==
The International Union for Conservation of Nature (IUCN) lists the Australian hobby as a species of least concern. It is listed on Appendix II of the Convention on International Trade in Endangered Species (CITES). Appendix II lists species that are not necessarily now threatened with extinction but that may become so unless trade is closely controlled. After DDT was introduced to agriculture in 1946, egg shell thickness of some species of falcon, including the Australian hobby, was significantly reduced. This led to some decline in local populations through egg breakage during incubation but did not eventuate in widespread population decline for the Australian hobby. Hobbies are susceptible to the columbid herpesvirus-1 (CoHV-1) infection which causes death by massive splenic and hepatic necrosis. The cause of infection is often attributed to the consumption of rock pigeons (Columbia livia) which carry the disease.
