= Illa de s'Espartar =

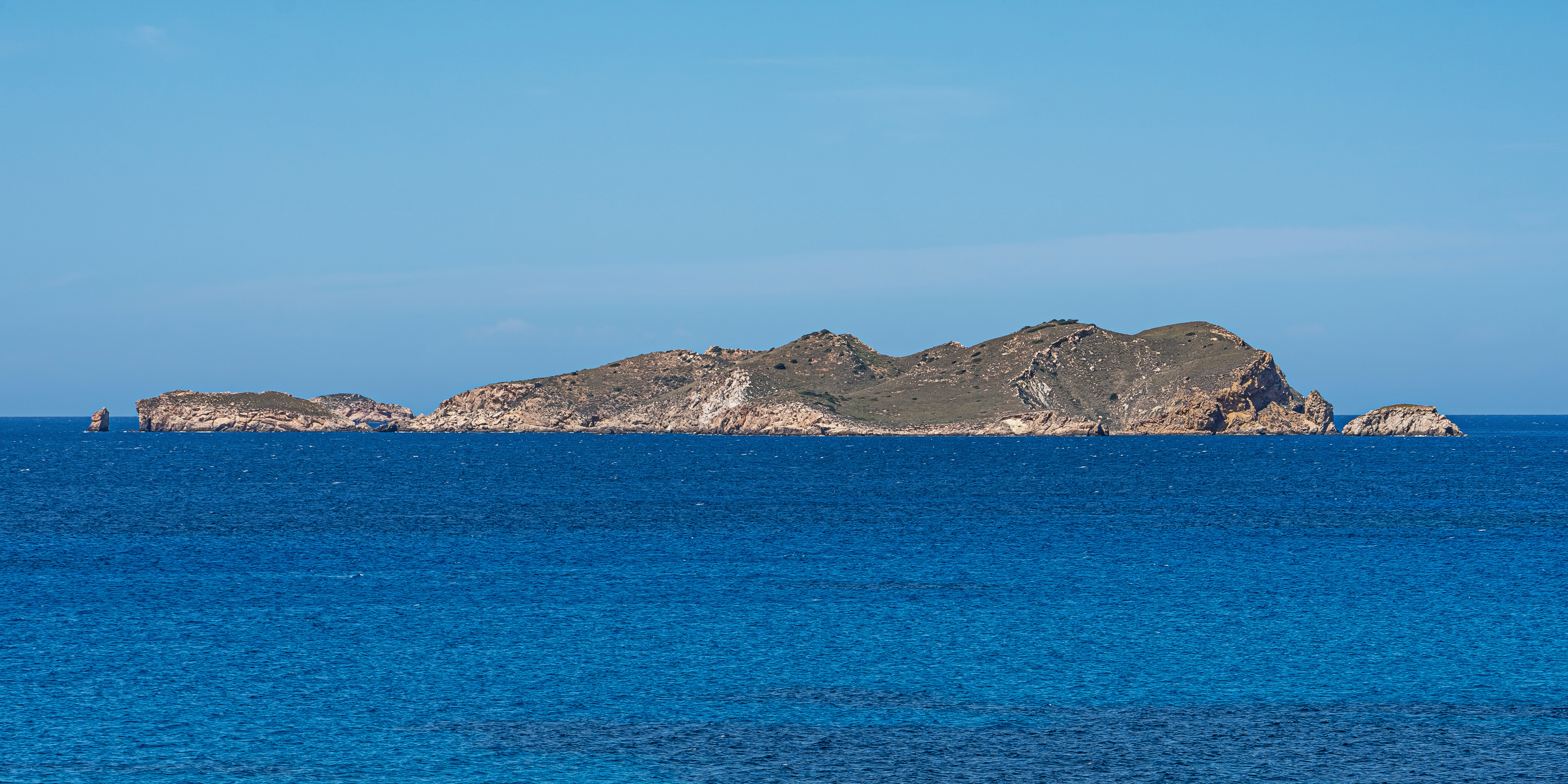

- Location within Balearic Islands

Geography
- Location: Balearic Sea
- Coordinates: 38°57′31″N 1°11′45″E
- Archipelago: Balearic Archipelago
- Area: 0.2 km^{2} (0.077 sq mi)

Administration
- Spain
- Autonomous Community: Balearic Islands
- Province: Ibiza
- Municipality: Sant Josep de sa Talaia

Demographics
- Population: 0

Illa de s'Espartar is a small uninhabited island of the north west seaboard of the Spanish island of Ibiza. It is within the municipality of Sant Josep de sa Talaia. The island is 8.4 kilometres (5.2 mi) west of the town of Sant Antoni de Portmany and is one of the smaller islands of the Balearic archipelago.

== Ecology ==
=== Fauna and Flora ===
The land is rocky and arid which supports 131 species including some endemic rare shrubs. This includes a very rare flowering alfalfa plant, alfalfa arborea. It is a member of the pea family and is on the red list of threatened species. Other vegetation includes such shrubs and herbs as rosemary, thyme and rue, which grow in abundance here. The fauna of the island includes an abundance of rabbits. There is also a sub-species of the Ibizan wall lizard on the island. It is also home to a colony of the endangered bird of prey Eleonora's falcon. There are also endemic beetles and snails. Birds include red-billed gulls and cormorants. There is also the largest colony in the western Mediterranean of the European storm petrel (Hydrobates pelagicus).
