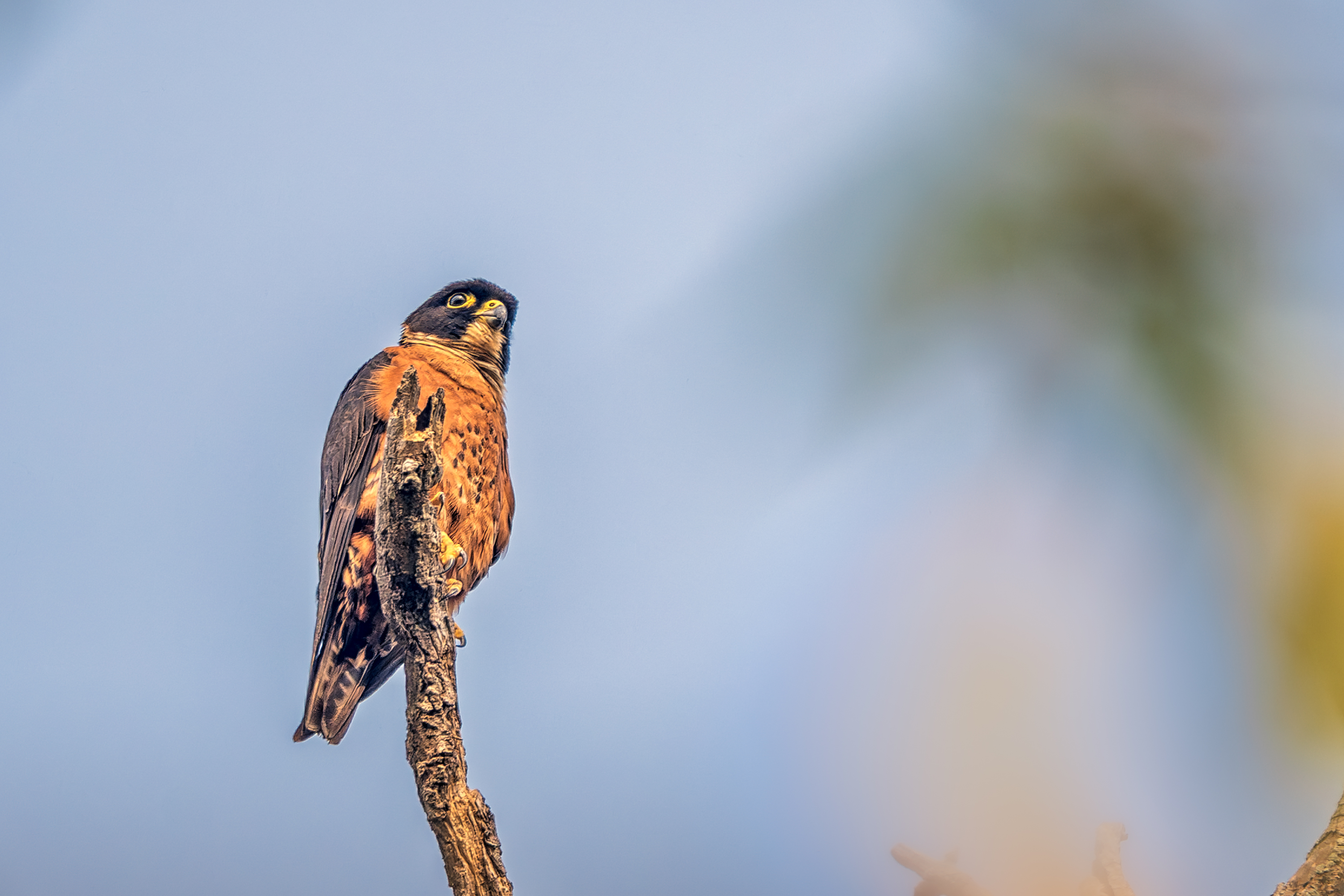
- In Bangladesh

Conservation status
- Least Concern (IUCN 3.1)]

Scientific classification
- Kingdom: Animalia
- Phylum: Chordata
- Class: Aves
- Order: Falconiformes
- Family: Falconidae
- Genus: Falco
- Subgenus: Falco
- Species: F. severus

Binomial name
- Falco severus Horsfield, 1821

= Oriental hobby =

Species of bird

The Oriental hobby (Falco severus) is an insectivorous species of falcon found across Southeast Asia, northeastern parts of the Indian subcontinent, through the Malay Archipelago, to New Guinea. Its conservation status is of least concern.

== Description ==
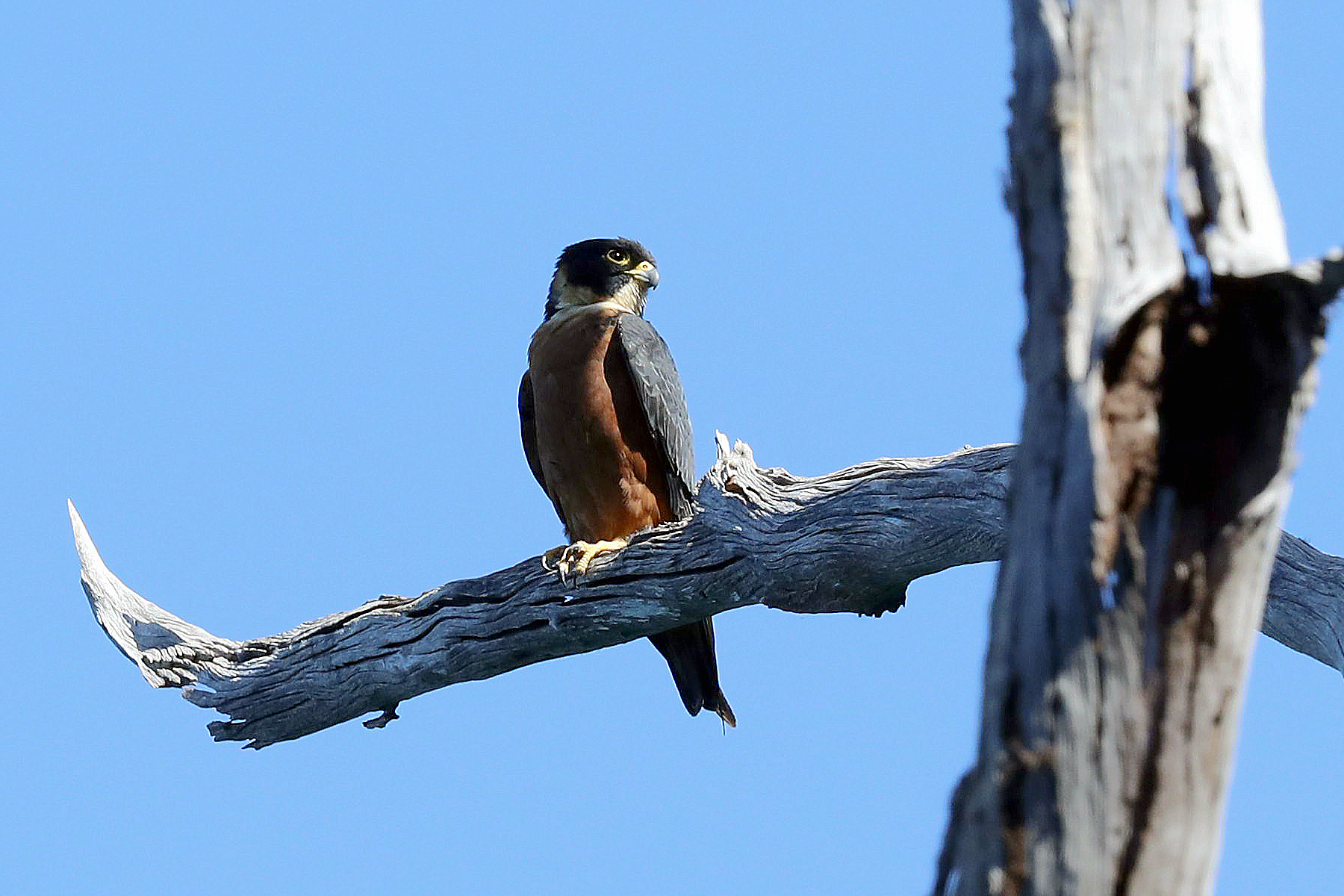
In southern Thailand

Adults have rich orange-red underparts and bluish-grey backs with black hoods and white throats. Their underwings are tan with gray bars, with coverts the same orange-red as their chest and belly. Fully grown, they are typically 28–33 cm long. Juveniles have pale orange chests with dark streaks down their breasts and bellies, and brown-black backs. Their underwings are the same pale orange as their chest and belly, with light gray bars. Both adults and juveniles have rectangular tails, yellow eye-rings, legs, and yellow beaks with black tips. They do not exhibit sexual dimorphism.The Oriental hobby flies swiftly and with few wing beats, mainly gliding.

The Oriental hobby resembles most closely the Eurasian hobby and Australian hobby. It differs from the former in that they have wholly orange-red underparts, while the Eurasian hobby only has an orange-red lower belly and legs. The Oriental hobby is additionally smaller and stockier than the Australian hobby, which can further be distinguished by their lighter head and black stripe running from the bases of their beak to the sides of their cheeks, merging into their black nape, which the Oriental hobby lacks, along with a white 'hook' shaped marking behind their cheeks.

== Taxonomy ==
The Oriental hobby is a member of the genus Falco within the family Falconidae, making it one of the roughly 40 species of falcon found on Earth. Specifically it is a member of the subgenus of the same name, Falco, which is made up of the hobbies. it was first described in 1821 by American medical doctor and naturalist, Thomas Horsfield. In 1893 Adolf Bernhard Meyer and Lionel William Wiglesworth described the Oriental hobby as being composed of two subspecies: F. s. severus in Asia and F. s. papuanus from Sulawesi to the Solomon Islands. As of 2022 F. s. papuanus is no longer considered distinct, with the species now treated as monotypic.

== Habitat and Distribution ==
The Oriental hobby is found locally in the Indo-Gangetic Plain in the north of the Indian subcontinent, across the eastern Himalayas, east across southern China and the Philippines, and southwards through Indochina to New Guinea and the Solomon Islands; its distribution is patchy, being absent from Borneo, Sumatra, and the Malay Peninsula, despite occurring both north and south of there. It has been recorded as a vagrant in Malaysia and southern India.

The Oriental hobby nests in trees and prefers sparser forests with clearings, or in foothills, and occasionally plantations. Currently, only 15% of it's range is considered suitable habitat for it, and while its current conservation status is of least concern, the Oriental hobby is predicted to lose 36-68% of this suitable habitat to climate change by 2080.

== Behavior ==
=== Diet ===
The Oriental hobby feeds mainly on insects and small birds which it hunts in the air. It has been spotted chasing small shore birds, and catching and then eating large grasshoppers. Not much else is known about its diet and hunting habits, as it is rather illusive.

=== Reproduction ===
Like most raptors, the Oriental hobby breeds once a year, during its courtship period of May to August.. During this courtship period the male performs aerial acrobatics to secure or attract a mate, often while calling. After copulation and before egg laying begins, the Oriental hobby engages in mate-feeding, where the male feeds their female mate, apparently to improve the females body condition to allow the laying of earlier and larger clutches. As is typical to falcons, the Oriental hobby has greater brood success in warm, dry, weather.

=== Vocalizations ===
The Oriental hobby has been known to produce a fast sounding gick, gick, gick, gick, gick call, otherwise very little is known regarding its vocalization habits.
