= Illa Conillera =

Island near Ibiza, Spain

Sa Conillera
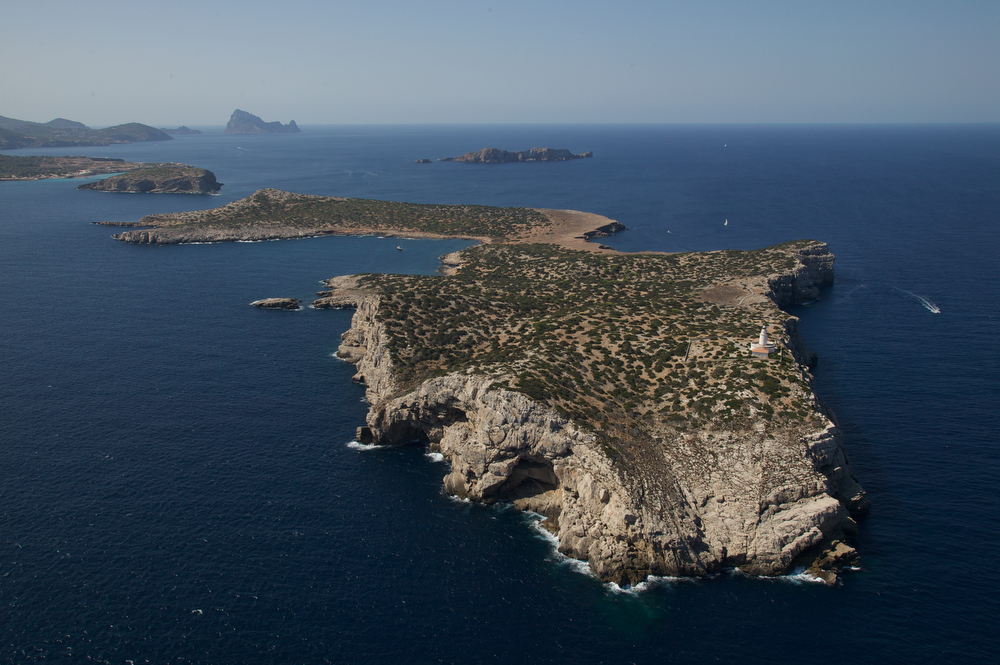
- Aerial view of Illa Conillera

- Location within Ibiza

Geography
- Location: Balearic Sea
- Coordinates: 38°59′20″N 1°12′41″E
- Archipelago: Balearic Archipelago
- Area: 100 ha (250 acres)

Administration
- Spain
- Autonomous Community: Balearic Islands
- Province: Ibiza
- Municipality: Sant Antoni de Portmany

Illa Conillera is an island of the north west seaboard of the Spanish island of Ibiza. The island is also known as Conejera or Sa Conillera. The island is 6.1 kilometres (3.8 mi) west of the town of Sant Antoni de Portmany and is one of the smaller islands of the Balearic archipelago.

== Description ==
The island has an area of approximately 100 hectares (250 acres) and is an elongated shape running north to south of a distance of 2.1 kilometres (1.3 mi). The island is mostly surrounded by deep water with a steep coastal perimeter.

== Lighthouse ==
The lighthouse on Illa Conillera was built in 1857. The tower sits above a circular building, the two rooms to the side are extensions added to the main structure in the year 1908. It is at the north west end of the island and the lantern is 85 metres (279 ft) above sea level. Under normal condition the light has a range of 18 nautical miles (33 km; 21 mi). The appearance of the light is of a group of four bright flashes every 20 seconds. During the day the lighthouse is seen as an 18 metres (59 ft) tall white washed tower.

== Ecology ==
=== Flora ===
The land is rocky and arid which supports very little vegetation apart from such shrubs and herbs as Rosemary, Thyme and Rue, which grow in abundance here. The island is also sparsely covered with Mastic, Stunted pines and Juniper (Sabina), many of which the wind has beaten into shrubby forms which dot this harsh landscape with green patches.

=== Fauna ===
There have been several endemic species recorded as living on the island. There is a type of cicada, whose monotonous, rattle snake like chirping can be heard all over the island. There is also a sub-species. of the Ibizan wall lizard on the island. It is also home to a colony of the endangered bird of prey called Eleonora's falcon. The island also has a large population of gulls and cormorant. By far the most numerous inhabitants of the island are the rabbits from which the island gets the name Rabbit Island.

== The Hannibal legend ==
There is a legend attached to the island that claims that the Carthaginian General Hannibal was born on the island. The story is that Hannibal's father Hamilcar Barca and his wife were aboard a warship and as they passed around the coast of Ibiza they were caught out by a particularly bad storm. Hamilcar ordered his captain to find a safe haven to ride out the storm. The ship sought shelter in an inlet on the south side of the island. Hamilcar's heavily pregnant wife was taken ashore and the party took shelter in a cave within the cliffs of the island. Within a short time, and at the will of the gods, Tanit and Bes, she gave birth to Hannibal. The cave on the southern side of the island is called sa Casa d'Annibal to this day.

== Pirates ==
Several years ago three skeletons were found on the islands. They were carbon dated to the early part of the sixteenth century and are believed to be the remains of pirates who had been taken to the island for execution. One of the skeletons had a lead bullet lodged in his spine whilst the other two showed signs of other torture. One of the torture victims had been beheaded, but his skull appeared nowhere on the island.
