= Sant Agustí des Vedrà =

- Village
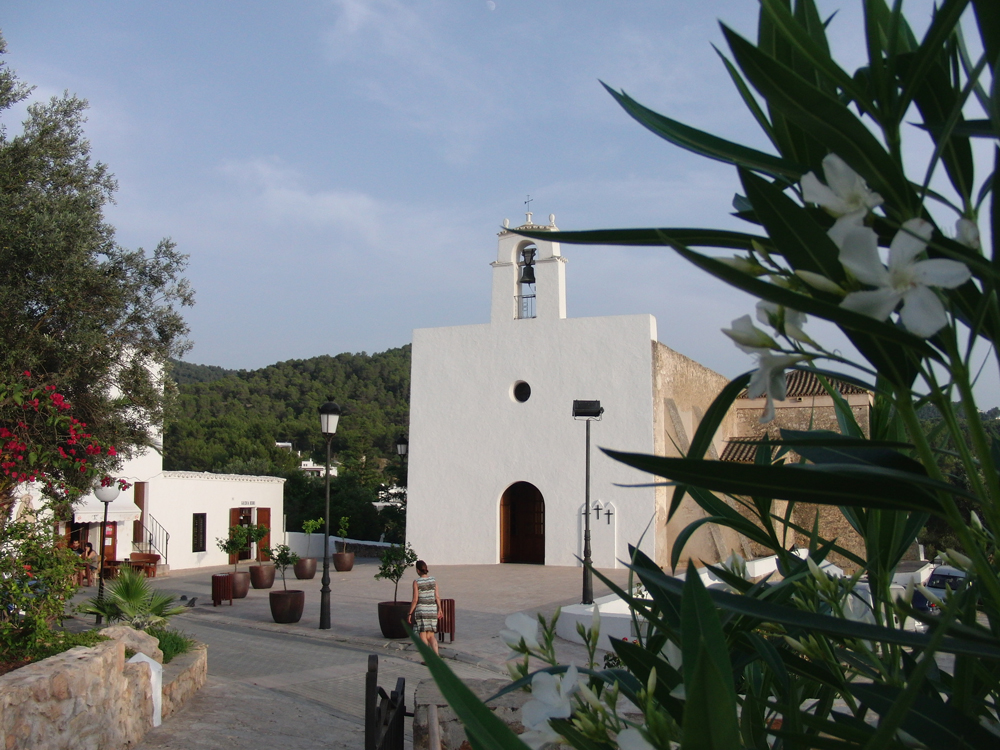
- The Parish Church

- Location of the village in Ibiza
- Coordinates: 38°56′27″N 1°17′38″E
- Country: Spain
- Region: Balearic Islands

Population (2006)
  - Total: 6,918
- Time zone: UTC+1 (CET)
  - Summer (DST): UTC+2 (CEST)

Sant Agustí des Vedrà is a small village in the West of the Spanish island of Ibiza. The village is in the municipality of Sant Josep de sa Talaia and is located on designated road EI-700. The village is 11.5 miles (18.5 km) North West of Ibiza Town and 9 miles (14 km) from Ibiza Airport. 3.3 kilometres (2.1 mi) to the North East of the village is the coastal town of Sant Antoni de Portmany.

== Location ==
This small village sits on the main road on top of a hill and commands views across the countryside. The village consist of three narrow streets clustered around the small parish church At the heart of the settlement. The village is made up of a few old farmhouses (Finca) and an ancient stone defence tower. The fields surrounding the village have grapevines, which produce a home-made fruity red wine of excellent quality. A short distance north west of the village there are many unspoilt beaches such as Cala Comte and Cala Bassa. The hill Puig de S’Avenc to the west is 243 meters above sea level.

== The Parish Church of 'Sant Agustí ==
The parish church is dedicated to Saint Augustine and was built in 1786 but was unfinished until the start of the nineteenth century, finally being blessed in 1806. The church was designed by the architect Pedro Criollez. This church has the irregularity of being the only church on the island facing to the north instead of the south. The reason for this peculiarity is that two of the villages different families insisted that the church to be constructed in their land. Finally, after much delay, the problem was fairly solved and the church was built between both lands, facing both land-owners’ homes, hence the west facing aspect. The original church was of a simple rectangular shape. The parish also was unable to fund a porch and the small priest’s house is hidden away around the back of this church. In 1850 two small side chapels were added resulting in the cruciform plan to be seen today.
