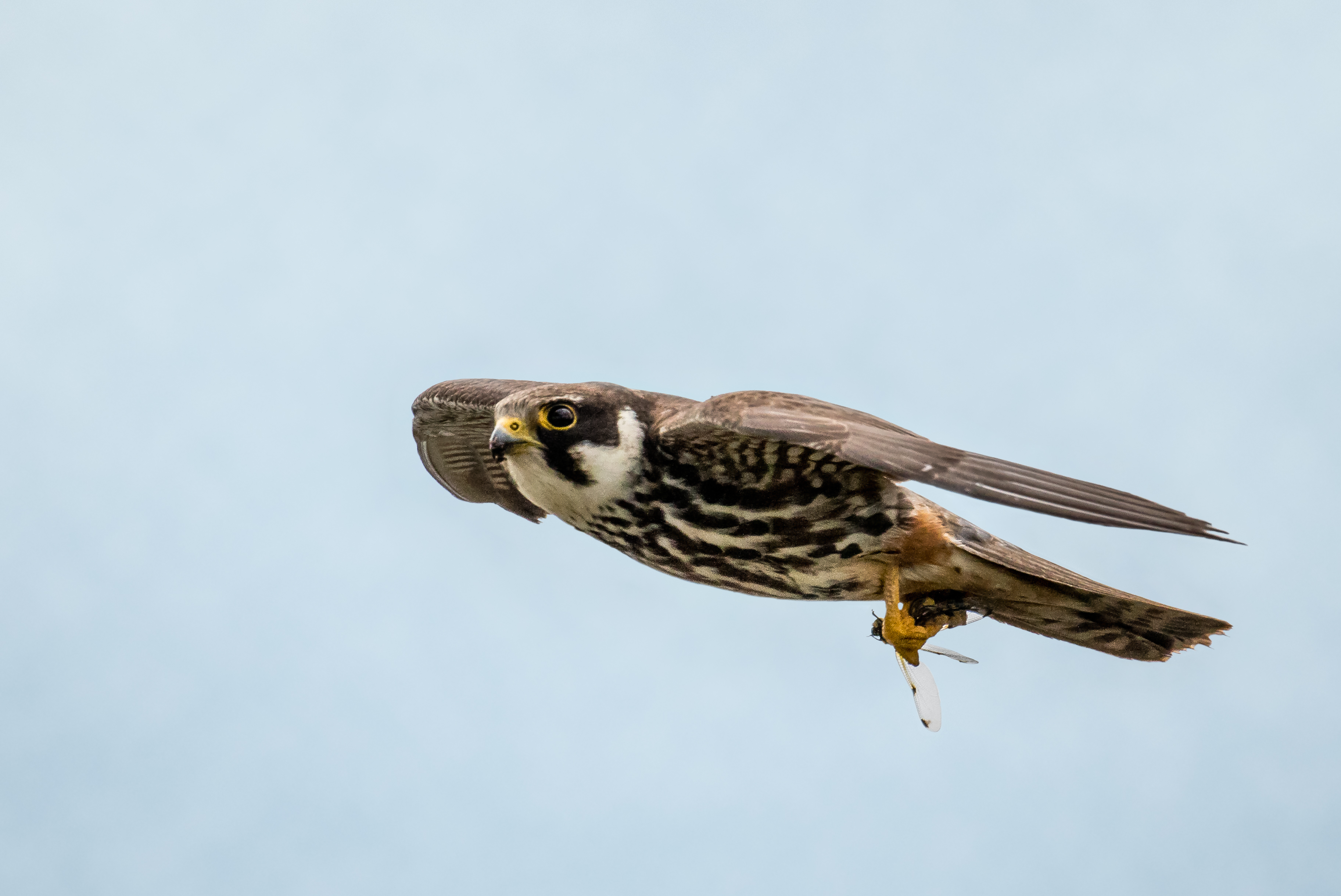
- Eurasian hobby (Falco subbuteo) showing the typical colour pattern

Scientific classification
- Kingdom: Animalia
- Phylum: Chordata
- Class: Aves
- Order: Falconiformes
- Family: Falconidae
- Genus: Falco
- Subgenus: Falco; Linnaeus, 1758

Species
- 6-8, see text.

= Hobby (bird) =

Hobbies

Subgenus of birds

A hobby is a fairly small, very swift falcon with long, narrow wings. There are four birds called "hobby", and some others, which although termed "falcon", are very similar. All specialise in being superb aerialists. Although they can take prey on the ground if the opportunity presents itself, most prey is caught on the wing; insects are often caught by hawking, and many different birds are caught in flight, where even the quick-manoeuvring swifts and swallows cannot always escape a hobby.

The typical hobbies are traditionally considered a subgenus; as the Eurasian hobby (F. subbuteo) is the type species of the genus, this is subgenus Falco Linnaeus, 1758, though sometimes cited by the synonym Hypotriorchis Boie, 1826. The species share similar morphology; the wings are long and slender with a swift-like shape, and the tail is relatively short (compared to other falcons like kestrels); they have ample amounts of dark slaty grey in their plumage; the malar stripe is black; and the underside usually has lengthwise black streaks. The tails are all-dark or have only slight bands; many (but not all) have orange-red feathering on the legs and lower belly.

Monophyly of Falco subgenus Falco is supported by DNA sequence data. The hobbies are one of the falcon lineages which emerged around the Miocene-Pliocene boundary around 5-6 million years ago and subsequently radiated throughout the Old World. Their relationship to other falcons, previously uncertain, was greatly clarified in a 2015 study; this showed that the Old World kestrels split off first, around 7.5 million years ago, and then a rapid major radiation around 5–6 million years ago into several groups, one of these being the hobbies together with two South American species; the latter two then diverging from the hobbies about 3 million years ago.

These six species comprise the hobbies:

- Eurasian hobby (F. subbuteo), breeding across temperate Eurasia, wintering in southern Africa and southern Asia.
- African hobby (F. cuvierii), resident in tropical Africa.
- Oriental hobby (F. severus), resident in southern India and southeast Asia.
- Australian hobby (F. longipennis), uncommon but widespread in Australia, some migrating north to the islands of Southeast Asia.
- Sooty falcon (F. concolor) of the North African desert, and migrating south to East Africa and Madagascar for the southern summer.
- Eleonora's falcon (F. eleonorae) breeds in the Mediterranean area during the northern summer, and migrating south to East Africa and Madagascar for the southern summer.

These two South American species are the closest relatives of the hobbies:

- Orange-breasted falcon (F. deiroleucus), resident in tropical South America.
- Bat falcon (F. rufigularis), resident in tropical South America.
