= Illa des Bosc =

Island in Ibiza, Spain

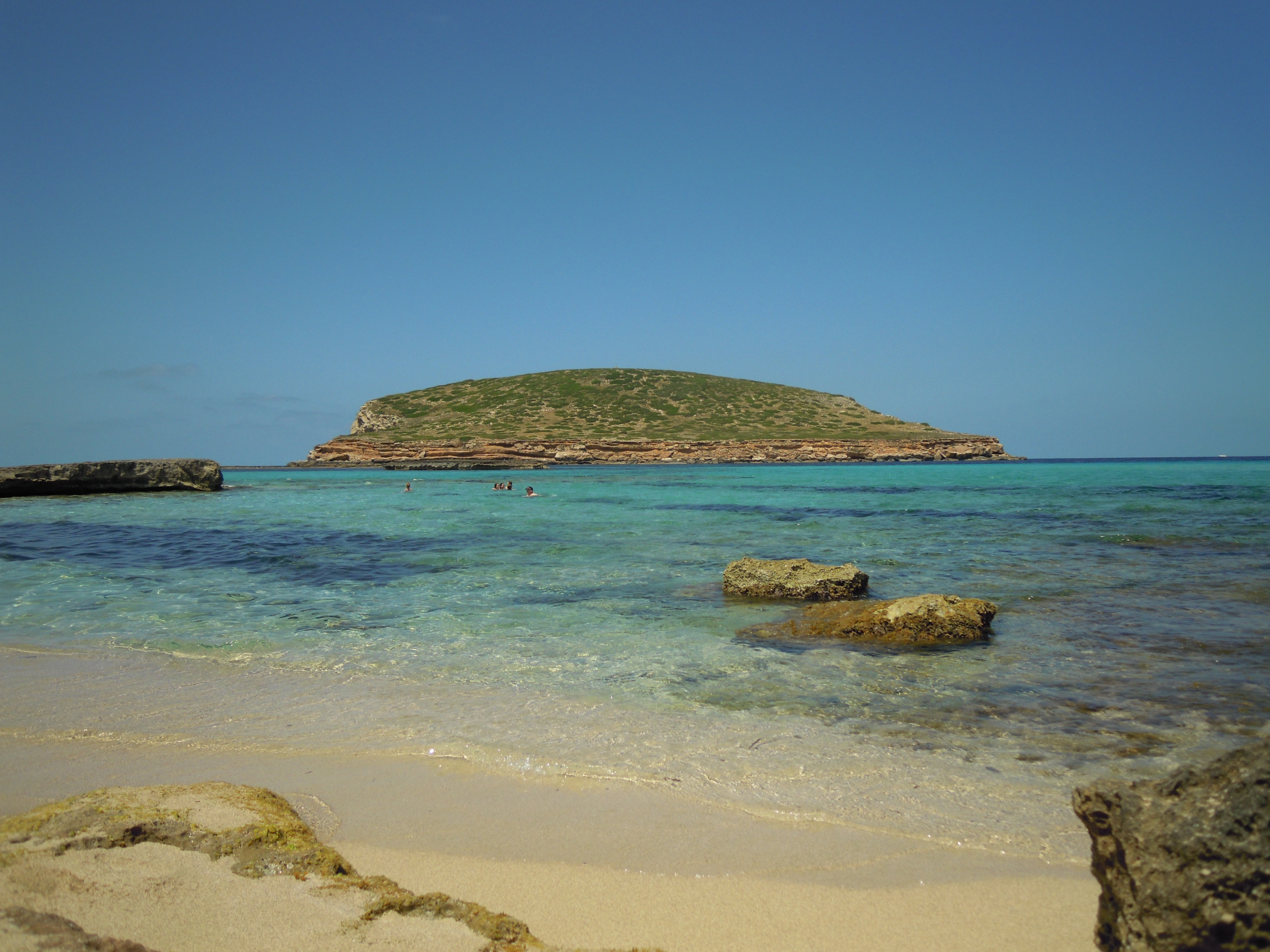

- Location within Ibiza

Geography
- Location: Balearic Sea
- Coordinates: 38°58′08″N 1°13′01″E
- Archipelago: Balearic Archipelago
- Area: 2.3 km^{2} (0.89 sq mi)

Administration
- Spain
- Autonomous Community: Balearic Islands
- Province: Ibiza
- Municipality: Sant Josep de sa Talaia

Demographics
- Population: 0

Illa des Bosc is a small uninhabited island of the north west seaboard of the Spanish island of Ibiza. It is within the municipality of Sant Josep de sa Talaia and is a short distance due north of the beach of Cala Comte. The island is 5.8 kilometres (3.6 mi) west of the town of Sant Antoni de Portmany and is one of the smaller islands of the Balearic archipelago.
