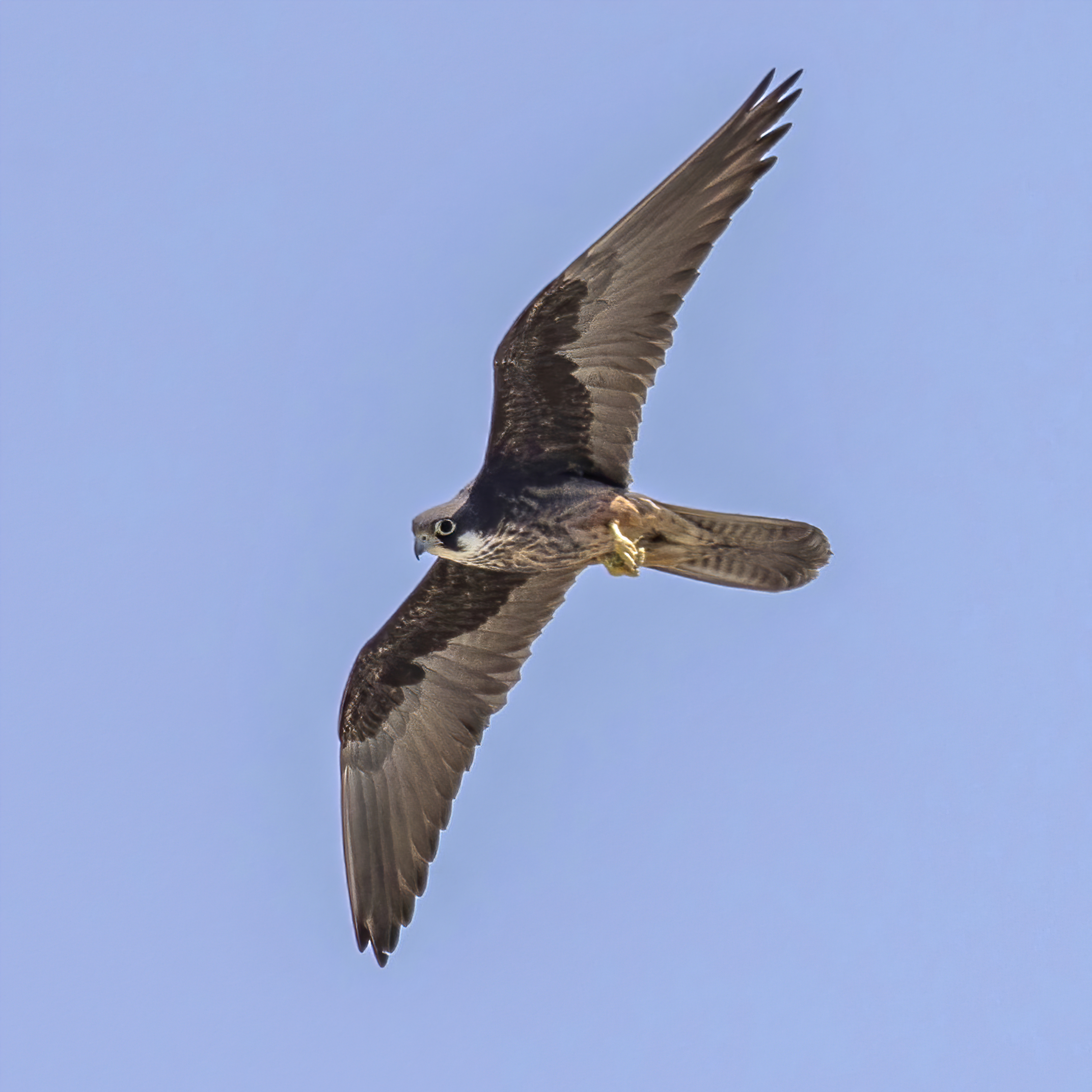
- Over the cliffs near Episkopi in Cyprus

Conservation status
- Least Concern (IUCN 3.1)

Scientific classification
- Kingdom: Animalia
- Phylum: Chordata
- Class: Aves
- Order: Falconiformes
- Family: Falconidae
- Genus: Falco
- Subgenus: Falco
- Species: F. eleonorae

Binomial name
- Falco eleonorae Géné, 1839
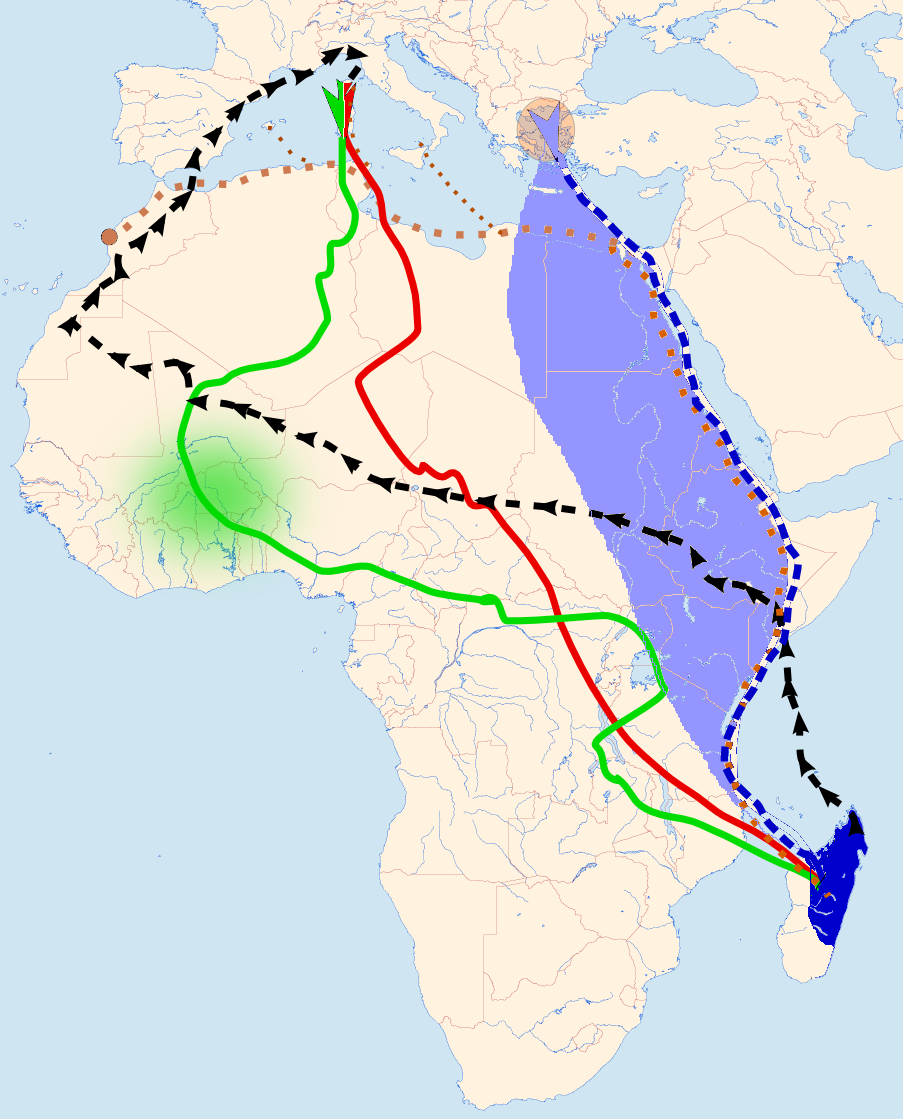
- Migration routes of Eleonora's falcon

= Eleonora's falcon =

Species of bird

Eleonora's falcon (Falco eleonorae) is a medium-sized falcon. It belongs to the hobby group, a rather close-knit number of similar falcons often considered a subgenus Falco. The sooty falcon is sometimes considered its closest relative, but while they certainly belong to the same lineage, they do not seem to be close sister species. The English name and the species name eleonorae commemorate Eleanor of Arborea, Queen or Lady-Judge (Juighissa) and national heroine of Sardinia, who in 1392, under the jurisdiction conferred by the Carta de Logu, became the first ruler in history to grant protection to hawk and falcon nests against illegal hunters. The genus name Falco is from Late Latin falx, falcis, a sickle, referring to the claws of the bird.

== Description ==
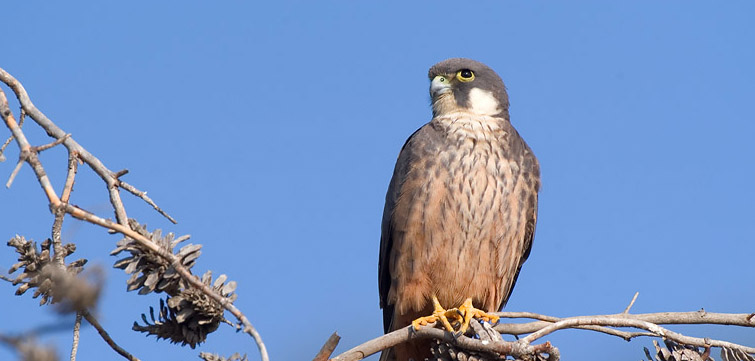
Perched on a branch in the Balearic Islands

Eleonora's falcon is a bird of prey, 36–42 cm (14–17 in) long with an 87–104 cm (34–41 in) wingspan. It is shaped like a large Eurasian hobby or a small slender peregrine falcon, with its long pointed wings, long tail and slim body.

There are two colour morphs: The adult dark morph is all sooty brown, with black underwing coverts. The light morph is more like a juvenile Eurasian hobby, but has buff underparts, and also shows the contrast between the black underwing coverts and paler base to the flight feathers. Young birds are also like a large juvenile hobby, but the pale underparts contrast with darker wingtips and wing coverts. The call is a typical falcon kek-kek-kek.

== Habitat and distribution ==
This species breeds on islands in the Mediterranean particularly off Greece (where two-thirds of the world's population breeds), but also in Cyprus, the Canary Islands, Ibiza and off Spain, Italy, Croatia, Morocco and Algeria. Tilos in the Dodecanese is the breeding area for 10% of the world population of Eleonora's falcons. Six hundred fifty pairs of this species breed on this island according to research conducted by the Hellenic Ornithological Society and the European Union LIFE-Nature program of Tilos. It is rare as a vagrant north of its range. It also lives on the coast of Madagascar and Mozambique.

== Migration route ==
This is a long-distance migrant, wintering in Madagascar. The migration route has been recently discovered and, contrary to previous suggestions, it has been demonstrated by satellite telemetry to be inland through the African continent. Traditionally it has been suggested to be coastal, with birds from the western end of the Mediterranean flying to Suez before flying south down the Red Sea, and across the Horn of Africa. However, recent satellite tracked animals by Spanish and German researchers have demonstrated an inland route through the Sahara Desert, the equatorial rainforests until reaching Kenya and Mozambique. The total distance covered during the flight has reached up to 9,000 km (5,600 mi) for a single one-way trip.

== Feeding and breeding ==
It will take large insects, such as dragonflies, which are transferred from talons to beak and eaten in flight. It has also been recently observed catching and imprisoning small birds, removing their flight feathers and feeding them, sometimes days later, to their young. This is unique among bird species. Occasionally, it was observed as feeding on bats.

This species has a delayed breeding season, in late summer, because it is a specialist hunter of migrating birds which pass through the Mediterranean islands at this time of year. It captures small birds in flight, using its speed and aerobatic skills. Birds spend much time cruising along coastal cliffs with steady wingbeats watching for tired incoming migrants. During a fieldwork study in Mogador Island, Morocco, researchers found that Eleonora's falcons are imprisoning live prey in rock crevices for later consumption. This falcon is unique in that it is one of the few species that breeds during early autumn, feeding its chicks with other migratory birds that are in abundance that period. It is also one of the few falcon species that creates breeding colonies. It nests on coastal cliffs, laying up to four eggs.

== Gallery ==
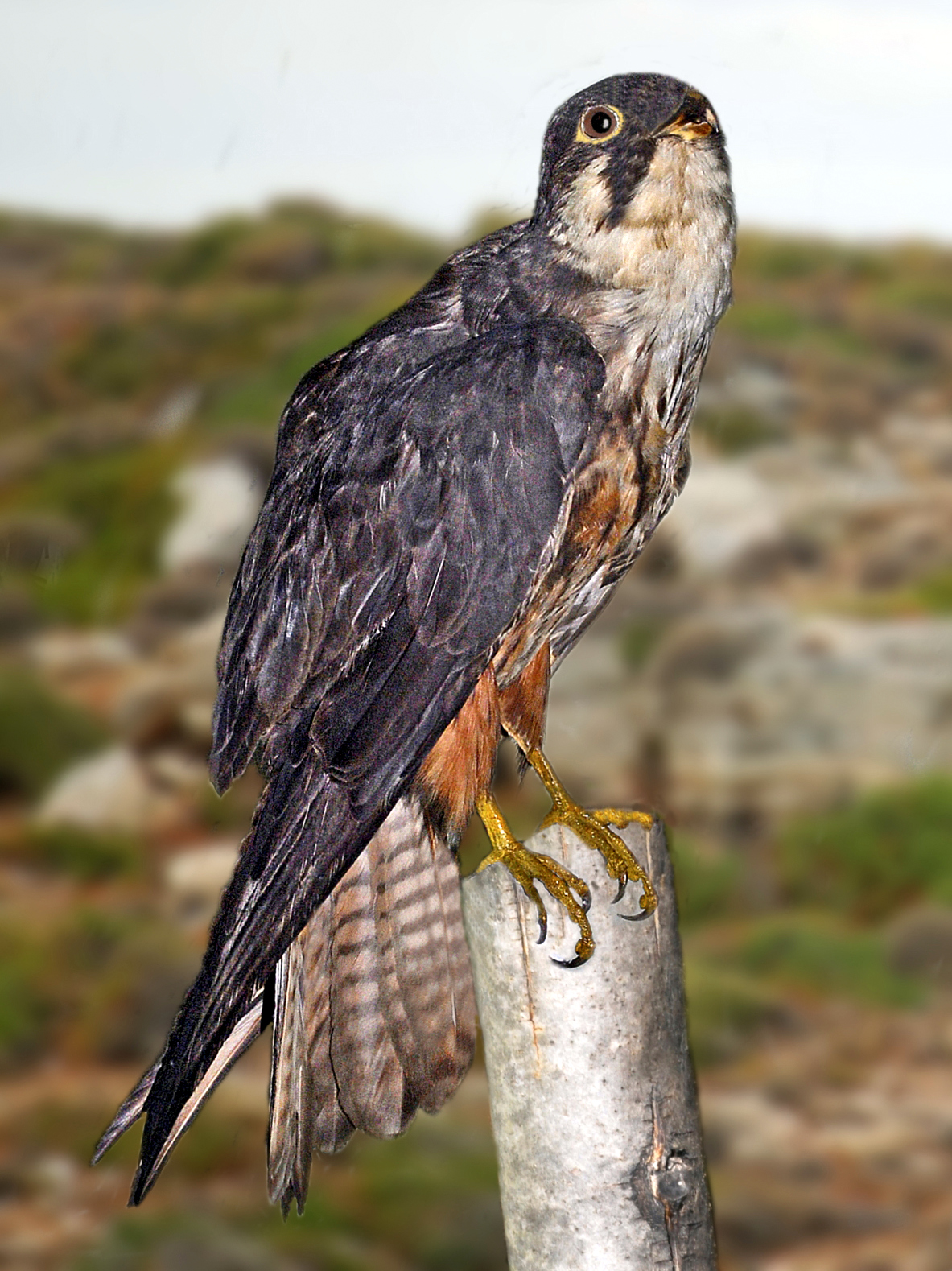
Falco eleonorae. Photomontage of Museum specimen

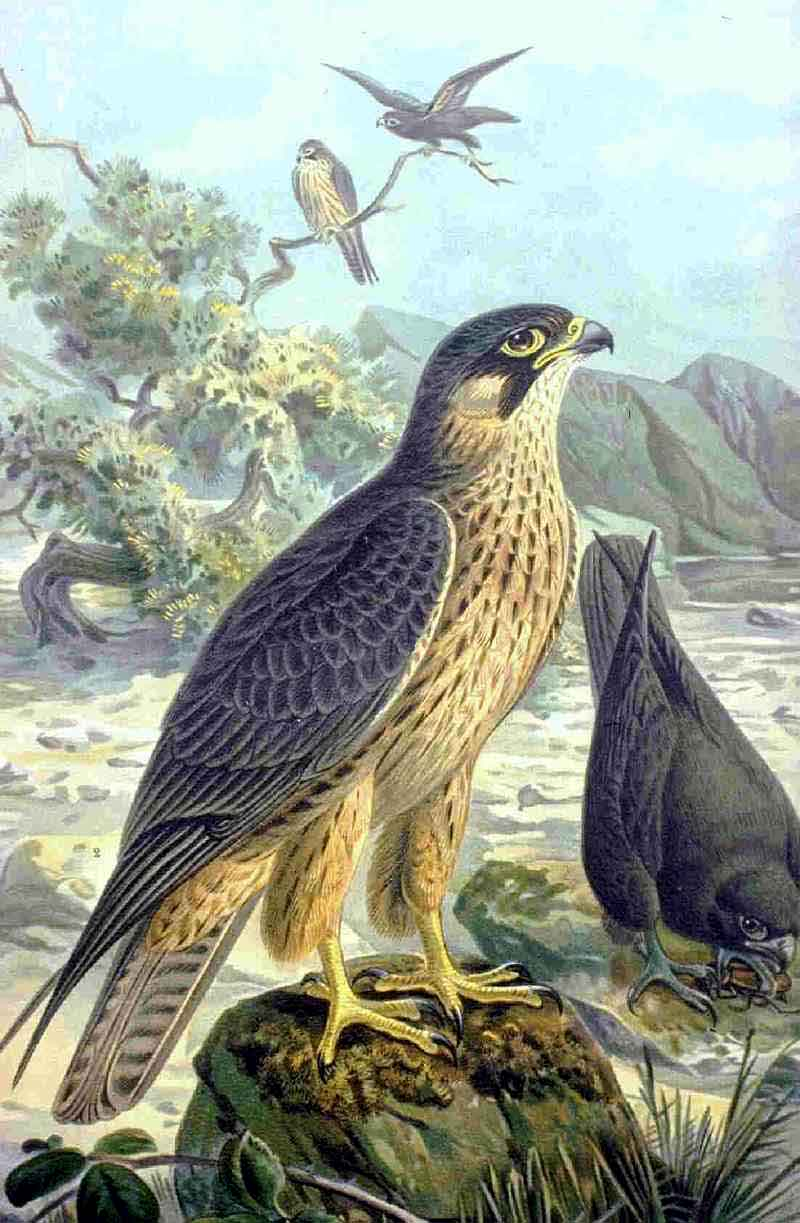
Illustration from Naturgeschichte der Vögel Mitteleuropas

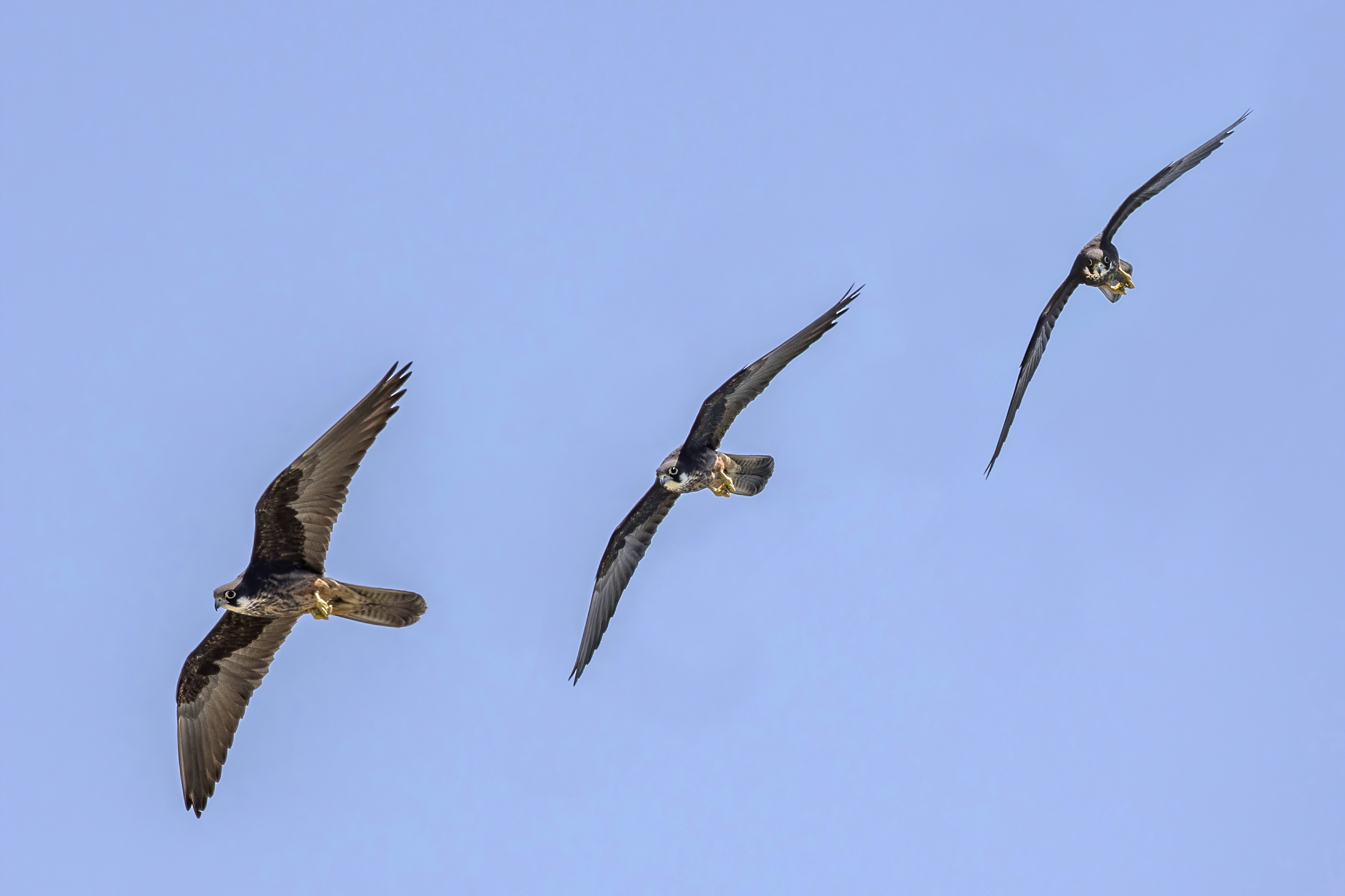
In flight composite

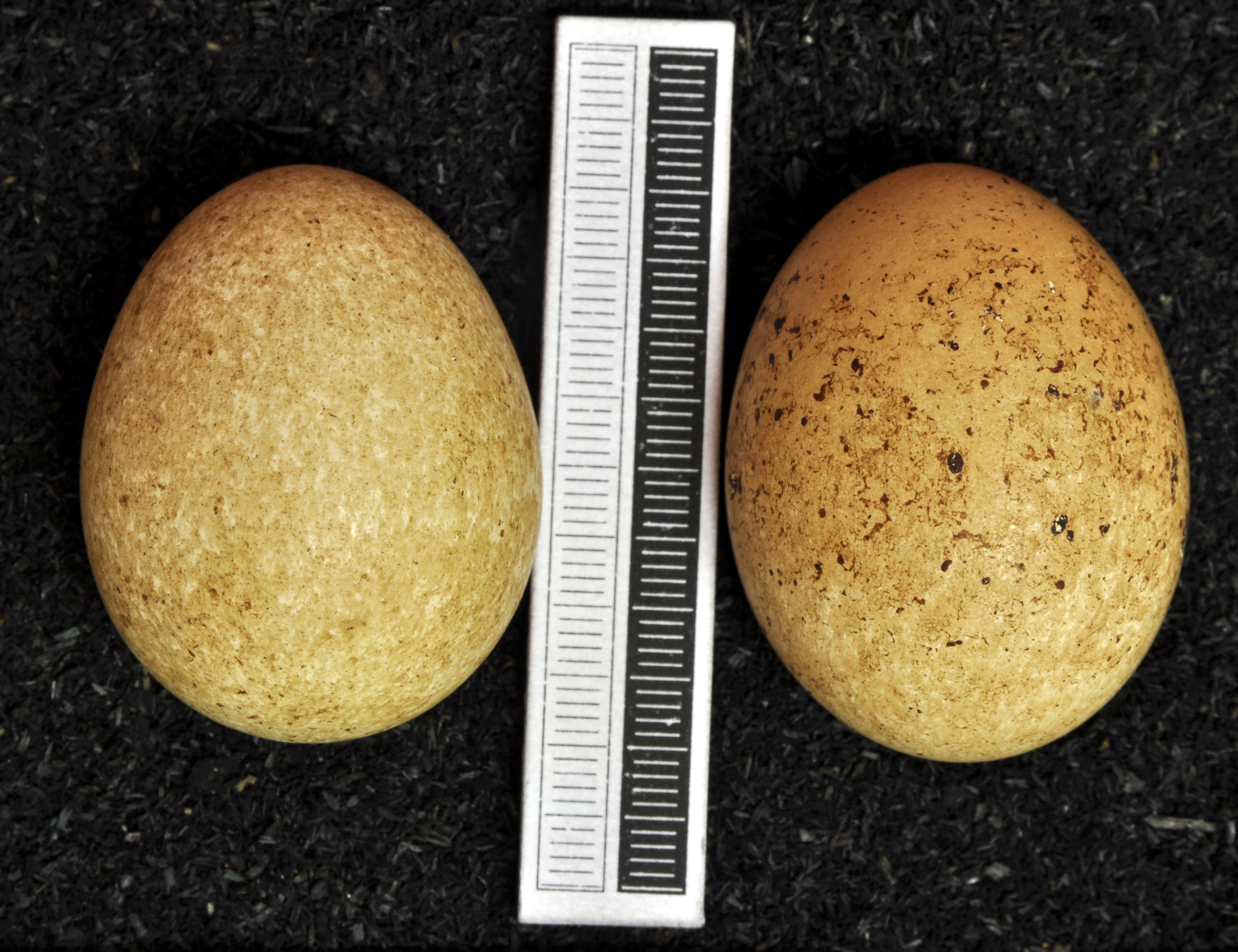
Eggs, Collection Museum Wiesbaden
