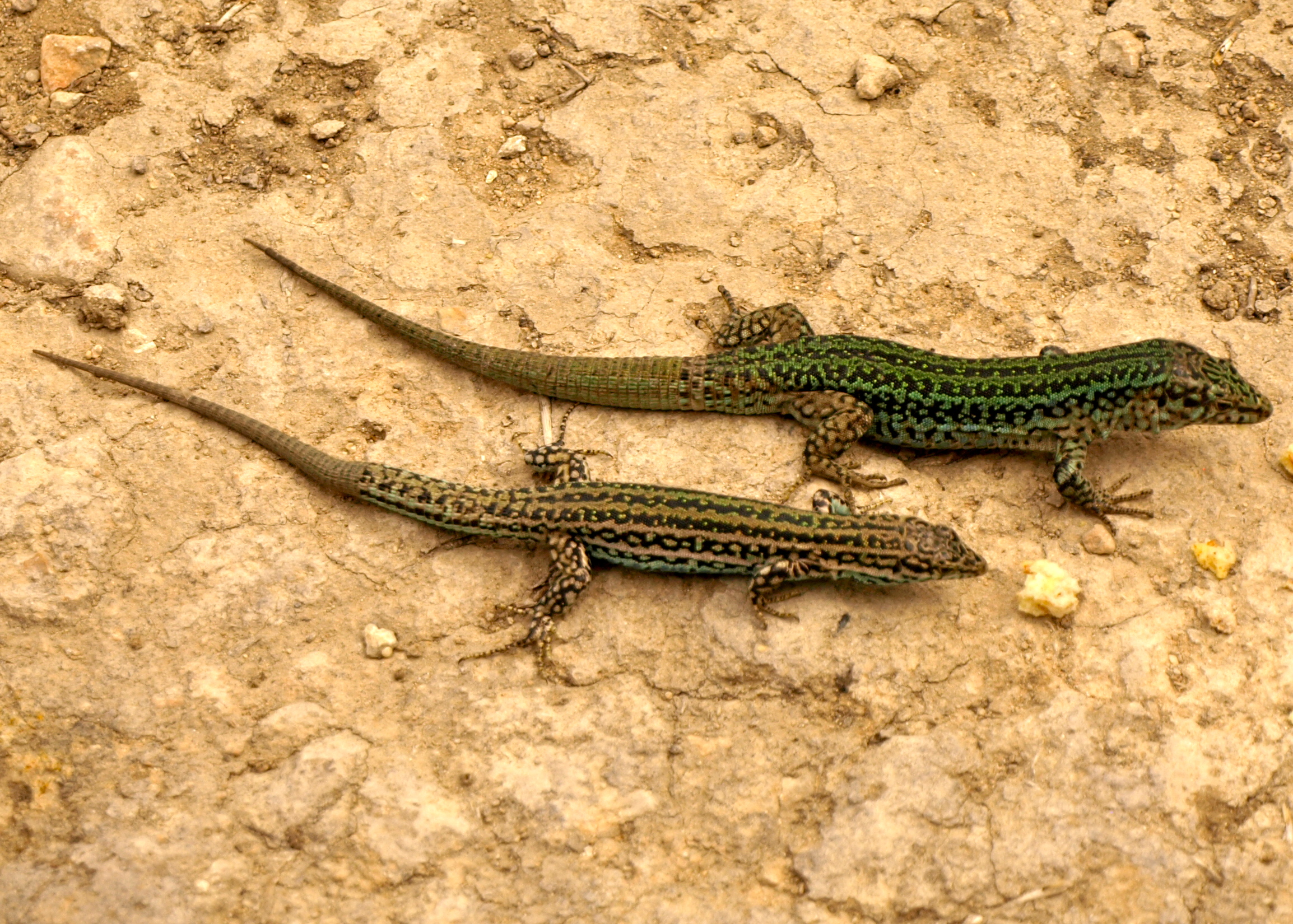

Conservation status
- Endangered (IUCN 3.1)
- CITES Appendix II

Scientific classification
- Kingdom: Animalia
- Phylum: Chordata
- Class: Reptilia
- Order: Squamata
- Family: Lacertidae
- Genus: Podarcis
- Species: P. pityusensis

Binomial name
- Podarcis pityusensis (Boscá, 1883)

= Ibiza wall lizard =

Species of lizard

The Ibiza wall lizard (Podarcis pityusensis) is a species of lizard in the family Lacertidae. It is most closely associated with the island of Eivissa, or Ibiza, in the Balearic Islands, but has become naturalized in parts of Spain.

A subspecies, P. pityusensis formenterae, is limited in natural habitat to the islands of Formentera, Illa Conillera and Es Vedrà, south of Ibiza, but has been transported by humans to several other locations in the Mediterranean. The Formentean subspecies tends to be more brightly coloured than its Ibizan and mainland con-specifics.

The natural habitats of P. pityusensis are temperate shrubland, Mediterranean-type shrubby vegetation, rocky areas, rocky shores, arable land, pastureland, plantations, rural gardens, and urban areas.

== Description ==
The Ibiza wall lizard grows to a maximum snout-to-vent length of 7 cm (3 in) but adults are usually a little smaller than this. The tail is about twice as long as the body. It is robust with a short-head and rounded body with relatively coarse, slightly keeled scales. The dorsal surface is usually green but can be grey or brownish. There is usually a well-defined pale dorso-lateral stripe and there may be a row of dark spots or a dark line running along the spine. The underside is white, cream, grey, orange or pink and the throat, and occasionally the belly, may be blotched with darker colour.

== Distribution and habitat ==
The Ibiza wall lizard is native to the islands of Ibiza and Formentera in the Balearic Islands and the neighbouring rocky islets. It has been introduced to Muella de Palma (Mallorca), Barcelona where it once was assumed it died out but was 're-discovered' in 2007 in the town of Aleria in southern Spain and the island of Gaztelugatxe in northern Spain. It is found at altitudes of up to 475 m (1,560 ft) above sea level. This lizard largely inhabits vegetated areas especially in those association with man. As well as gardens, pasture and arable land, it is found on rocks, especially near the coast. On some small islets, it may be very common and live almost exclusively on rock.

== Biology ==
The Ibiza wall lizard feeds on small invertebrates including a high proportion of ants when they are available. It also eats vegetable matter, especially during the summer. Females generally produce a single clutch of one to four eggs. These hatch after a few weeks and the hatchlings are about 3.2 cm (1.3 in) long from snout to vent. They become sexually mature at the age of one and a half or two years.

== Status ==
The Ibiza wall lizard is in overall decline and is projected to lose most of its remaining habitat. The number of mature individuals has declined by an estimated 50% since 2010, so the IUCN lists it as being "Endangered". This is mostly attributed to invasive Horseshoe whip snakes which originated from mainland Spain and came to Ibiza in imported olive trees. One local extinction on an offshore islet has been recorded.

== Gallery ==
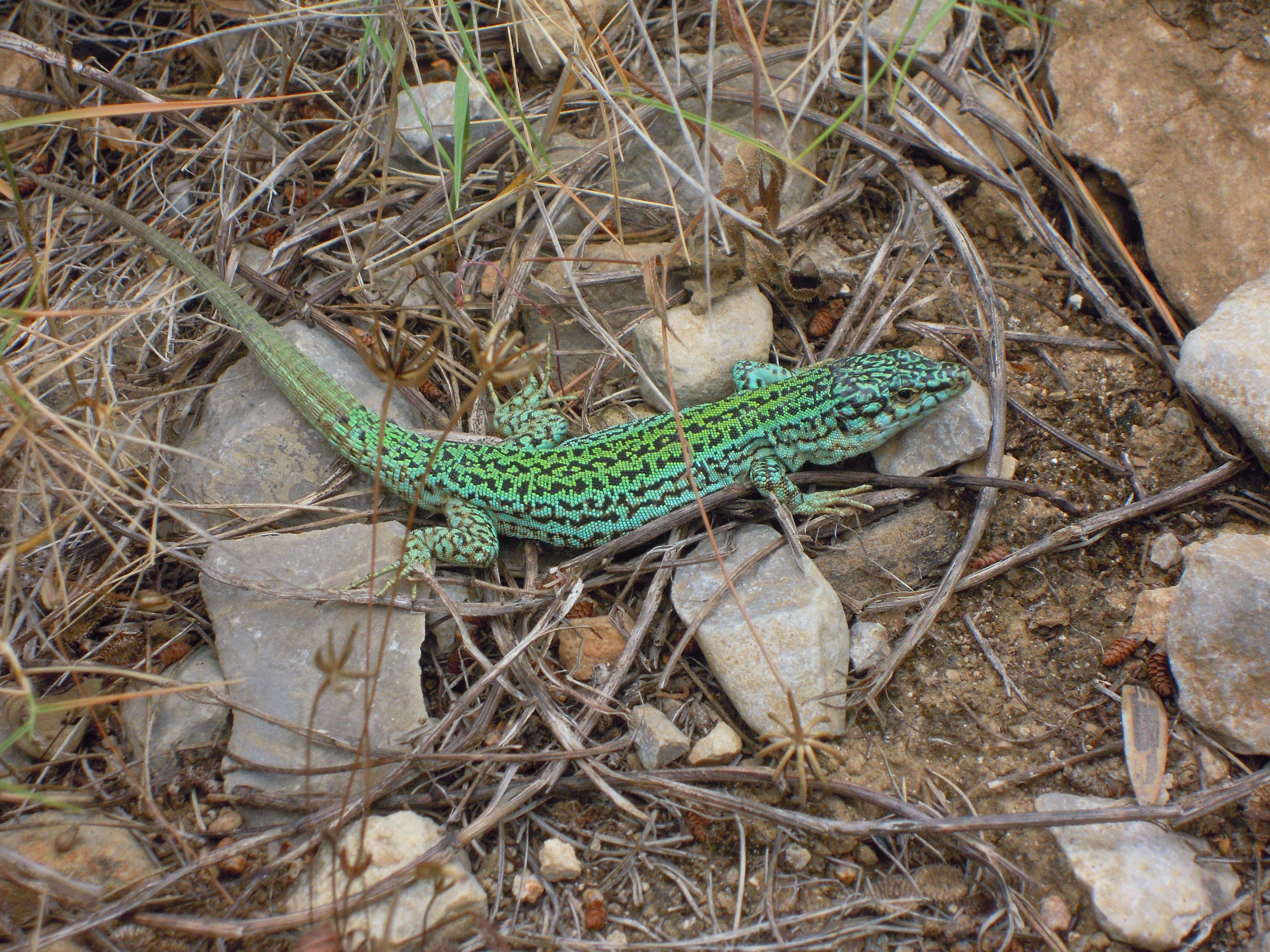

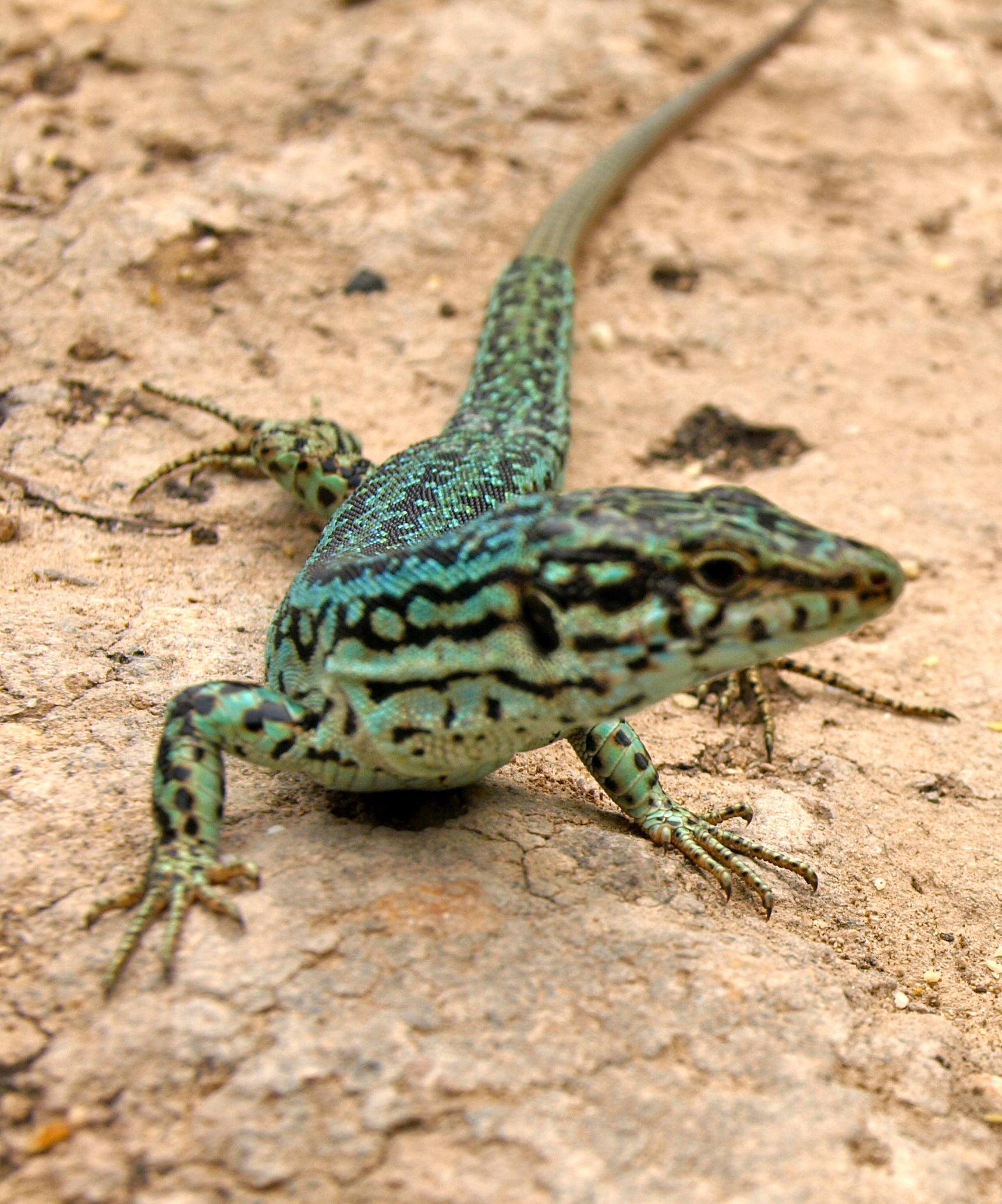

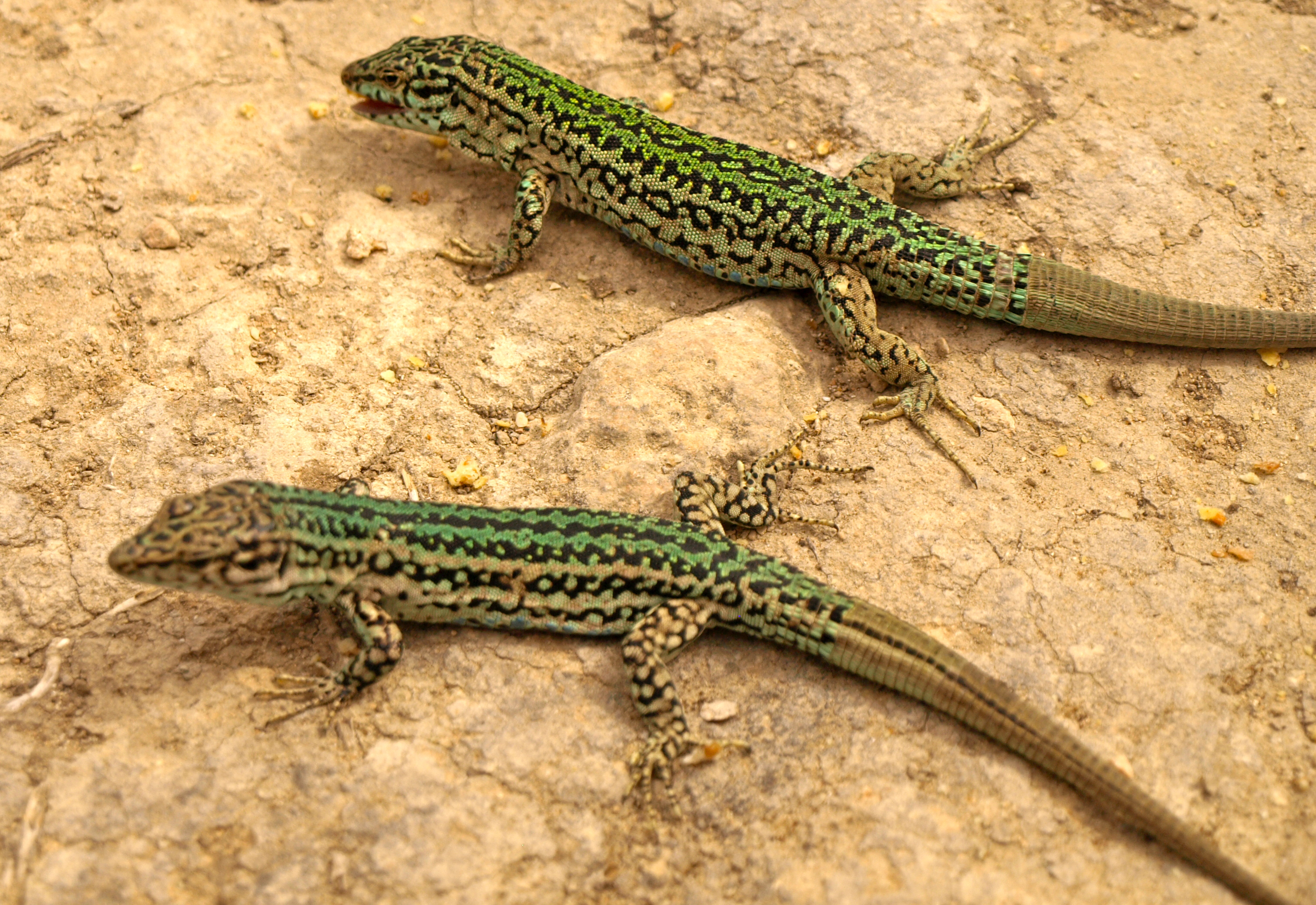

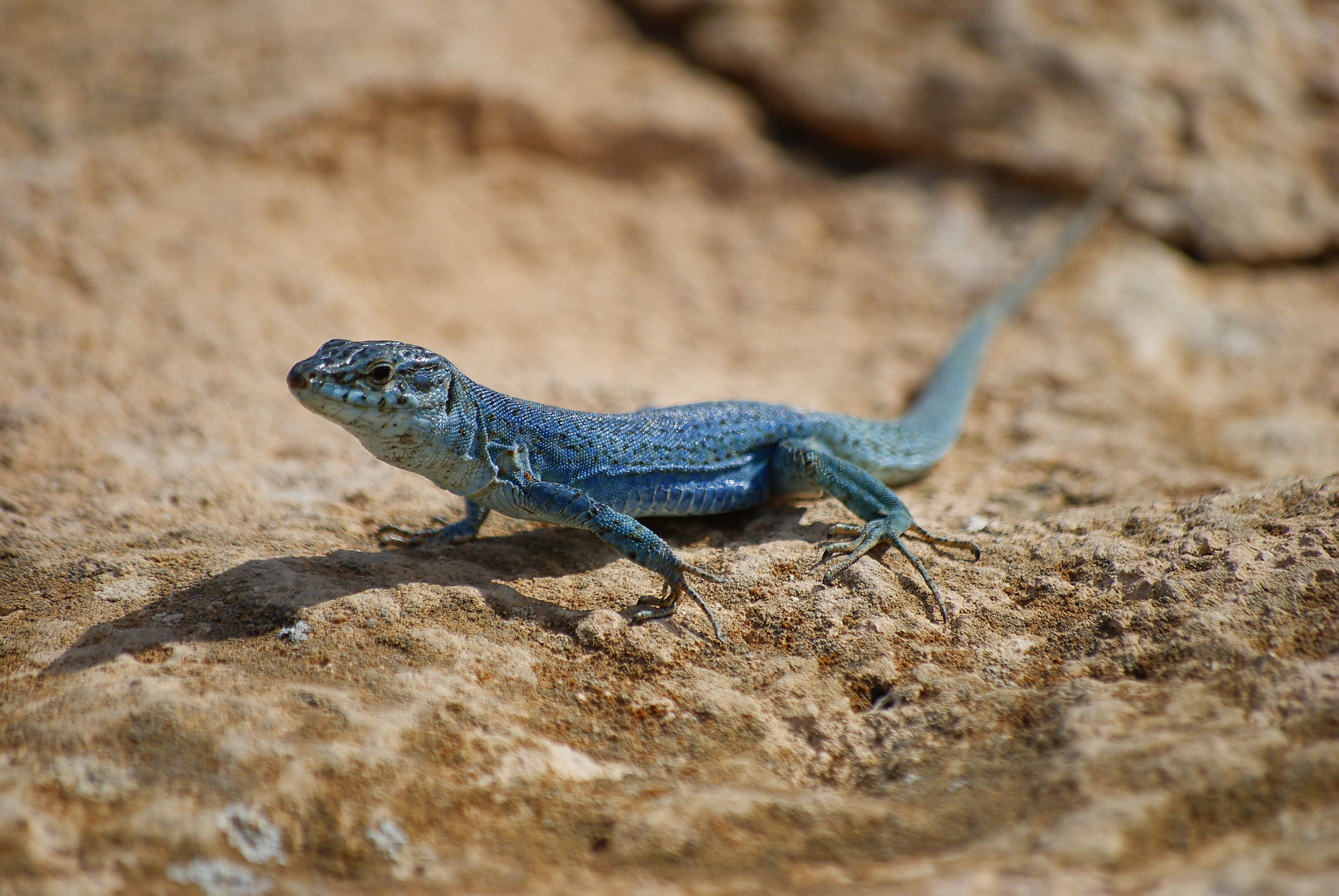
The subspecies Formentera wall lizard (P. pityusensis formenterae)

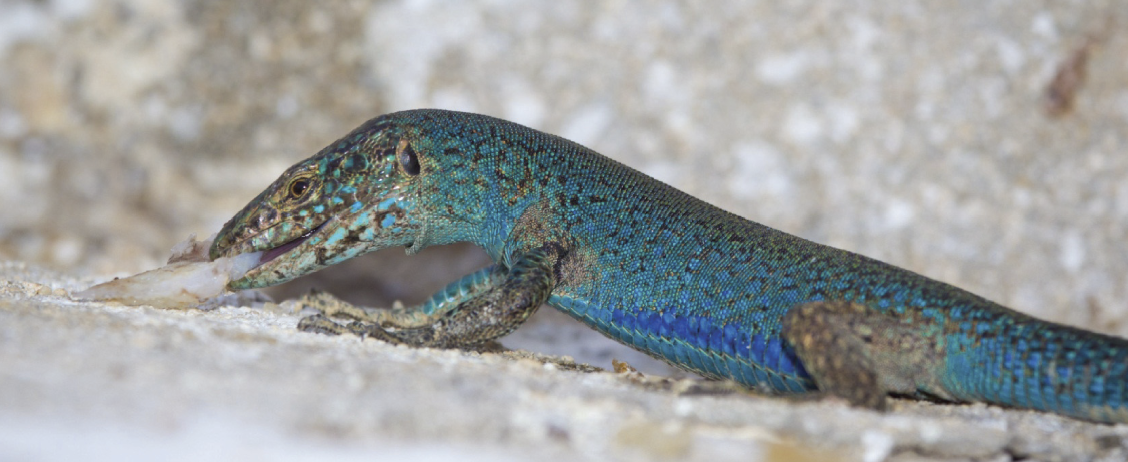
Scavenging on fish scraps

== See also ==
- The Italian wall lizard, a related species
