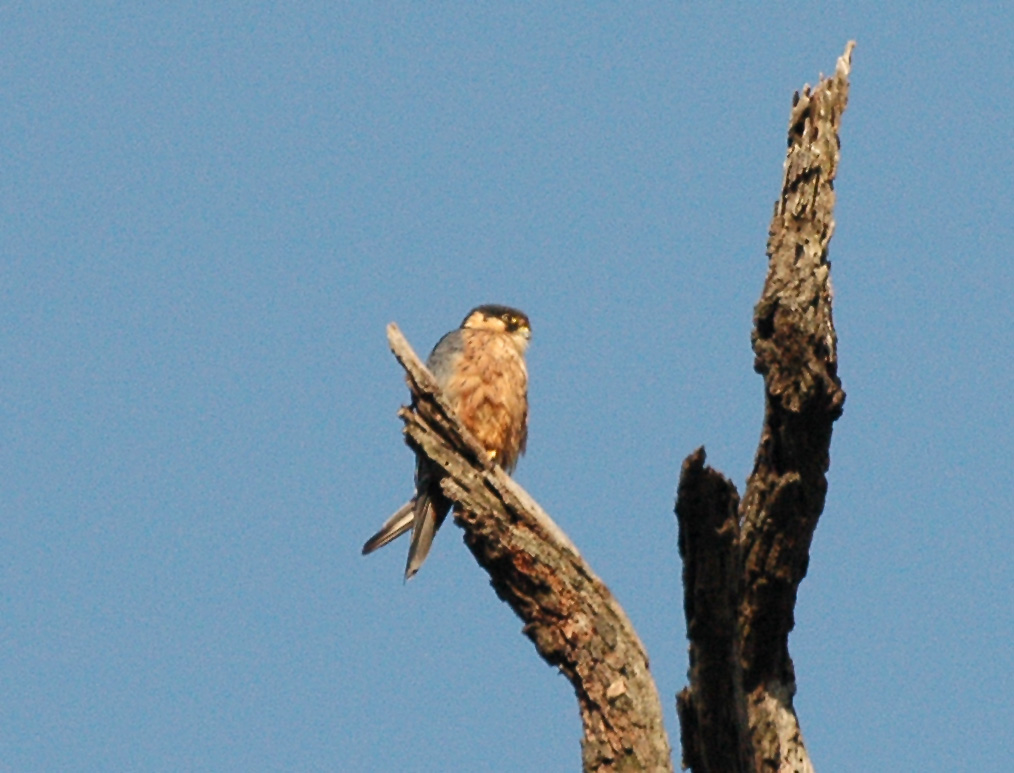

Conservation status
- Least Concern (IUCN 3.1)

Scientific classification
- Kingdom: Animalia
- Phylum: Chordata
- Class: Aves
- Order: Falconiformes
- Family: Falconidae
- Genus: Falco
- Subgenus: Falco
- Species: F. cuvierii

Binomial name
- Falco cuvierii Smith, 1830

= African hobby =

Species of bird

The African hobby (Falco cuvierii) is a small species of bird of prey in the family Falconidae.

== Description ==
A small, slim falcon with blackish upperparts and deep rufous underparts with rufous cheek, nape and throat. At close range black streaks can be seen on the throat and flanks. The facial skin and feet are yellow. Juvenile birds are browner above with heavier streaking on the underparts and paler on cheek, nape and throat. Their length is 20 centimetres (7.9 in) and wing span 70 centimetres (28 in).

== Habitat ==
They are mostly found in the edge of moist woodlands and forests, commonest in palm savannah and gallery forest in west and western regions of East Africa. They are less common in central Africa and north-eastern Africa.

== Behaviour and diet ==
Hunts on the wing, mainly at dawn and dusk. When not breeding the African hobby is thought to feed almost entirely on flying insects: termite alates, grasshoppers, locusts, beetles and cicadas have all been recorded. Feeding concentrations of up to 30 birds have been recorded when termite alates or locusts are swarming. When breeding a high proportion of small birds such as weavers, estrildid finches and swallows up to the size of doves are favoured. It hunts either by making sorties from a perch or quartering across favoured hunting areas at 50–100 metres (160–330 ft). Normally encountered as solitary birds but sometimes in pairs or small family groups. For nesting they use the old stick nests of other birds, especially black kite, which are situated high in a tree. Breeding has been recorded in December to June in the western part of the range, August to December in equatorial East Africa and September to January in southern Africa.

== Distribution ==
It is found in Angola, Benin, Botswana, Burkina Faso, Burundi, Cameroon, Central African Republic, Chad, Republic of the Congo, Democratic Republic of the Congo, Ivory Coast, Eswatini, Ethiopia, Gabon, Gambia, Ghana, Guinea, Guinea-Bissau, Kenya, Liberia, Malawi, Mali, Mozambique, Namibia, Niger, Nigeria, Rwanda, Senegal, Sierra Leone, Somalia, South Africa, Sudan, Tanzania, Togo, Uganda, Zambia, and Zimbabwe. This species can be nomadic, following food sources.

== Taxonomy ==
African hobby is a monotypic species. As a typical hobby it has been traditionally considered a member of the subgenus Falco due to its similar morphology to the other hobbies.
