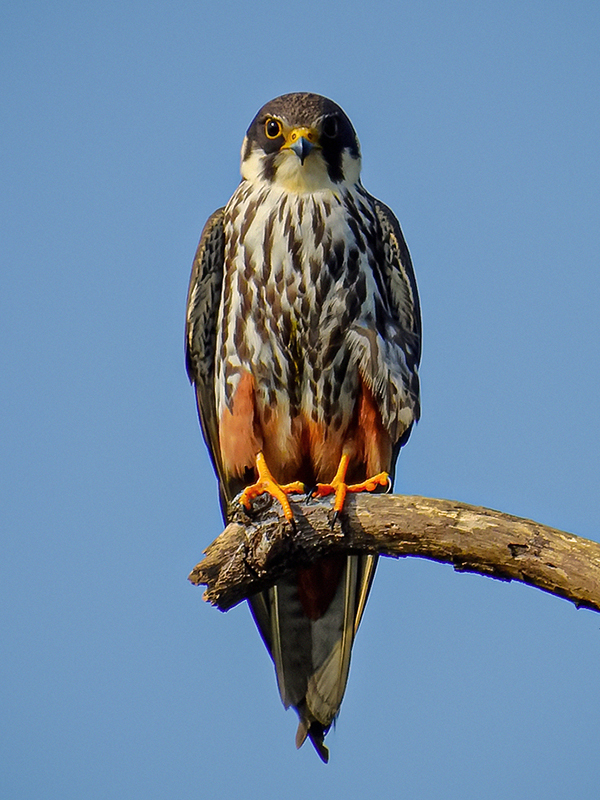
- Falco subbuteo passage migrant in Mangaon, Raigad, Maharashtra, India

Conservation status
- Least Concern (IUCN 3.1)

Scientific classification
- Kingdom: Animalia
- Phylum: Chordata
- Class: Aves
- Order: Falconiformes
- Family: Falconidae
- Genus: Falco
- Subgenus: Falco
- Species: F. subbuteo

Binomial name
- Falco subbuteo Linnaeus, 1758
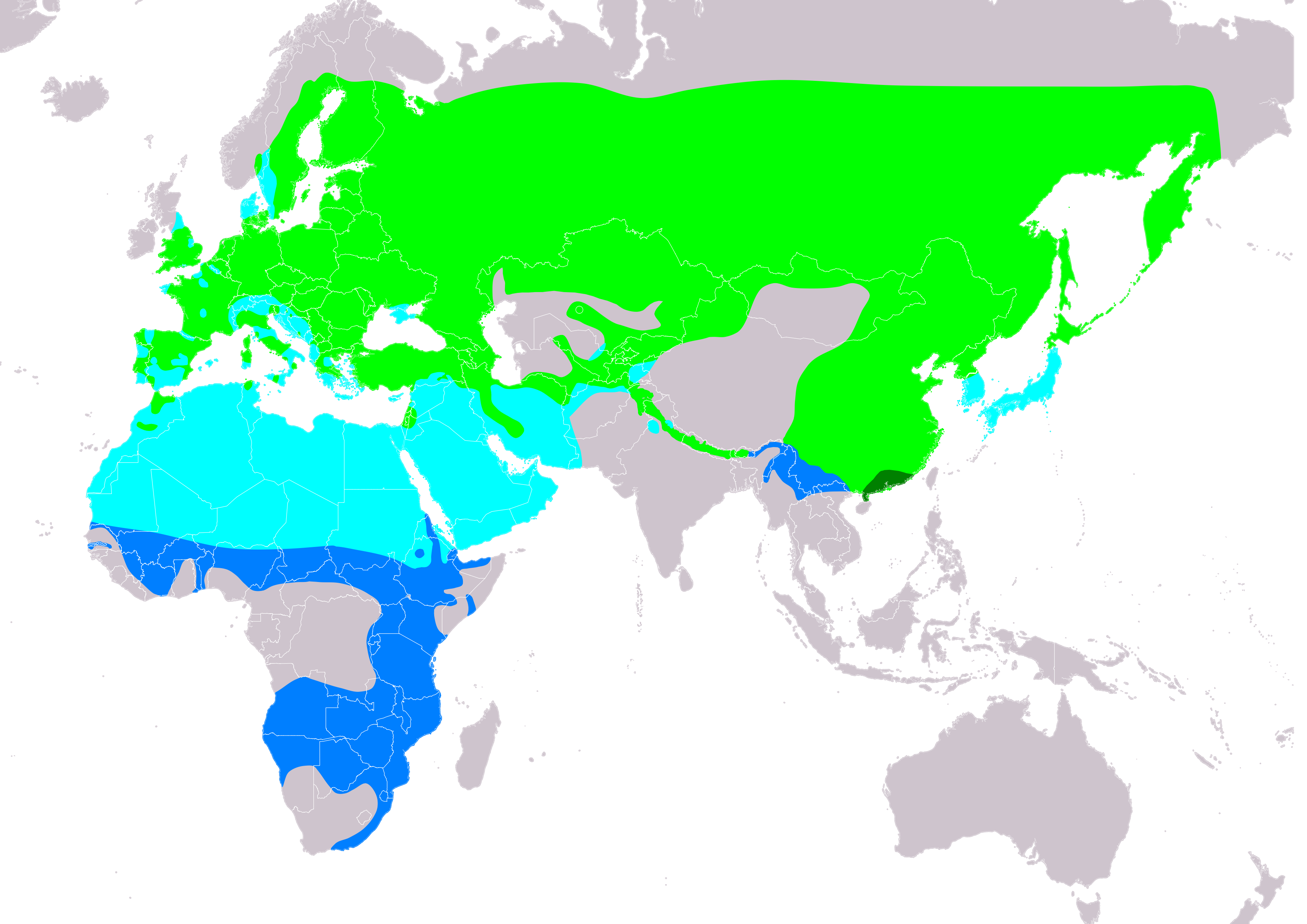
- Range of F. subbuteo Breeding Resident Passage Non-breeding

= Eurasian hobby =

Species of bird

The Eurasian hobby (Falco subbuteo), or just hobby, is a small, slim falcon. It belongs to a group of similar falcons often considered a subgenus of Falco.

== Taxonomy and systematics ==
The first formal description of the Eurasian hobby was by the Swedish naturalist Carl Linnaeus in 1758 in the tenth edition of his Systema Naturae under the present binomial name Falco subbuteo. The genus name falco derives from Late Latin falx, falcis, a sickle, referring to the wing profile of the bird. The species name subbuteo is from Latin sub, "below, less than, under" and buteo, "buzzard". The species' English name comes from Old French hobé or hobet. It became the trademark for the Subbuteo games company after its creator, who was an ornithologist, was refused permission to register "Hobby".

Two subspecies are recognized:

- F. s. subbuteo: the nominate race is resident in Africa, Europe and Central and East Asia, winters in Central and South Africa and South Asia
- F. s. streichi: described by Ernst Hartert and Oscar Neumann in 1907, is smaller and is a resident species from Myanmar to south China and north Indochina.

== Description ==
Adults are slate-grey above with a dark crown and two short black moustache stripes. The throat is unstreaked white, the thighs and undertail coverts are unstreaked rufous and the rest of the underparts are whitish with black streaks. Close views enable the red "trousers" and vent to be seen. Sexes are similar. Juveniles are generally much browner, with scaled upper parts and streaked buffy thighs and undertail coverts.

The hobby has a distinct first-summer plumage.

This falcon is 29–36 cm (11–14 in) in length with a wingspan of 74–84 cm (29–33 in) and a weight of 175–285 g (6.2–10.1 oz).

== Distribution and habitat ==
This species breeds across the Palearctic realm. The subspecies F. s. subbuteo is a long-distance migrant, wintering in Africa. The subspecies F. s. streichi is mainly resident and does not migrate. It is a rare vagrant in North America, with extralimital records from Massachusetts, Washington, and Alaska in the United States, as well as in Newfoundland and British Columbia in Canada. It has also been sighted in Australia and Brazil.

== Behaviour and ecology ==
It is a bird of open country, such as farmland, marshes, taiga and savannah. They are widespread in lowlands with scattered small woods. It is an elegant bird of prey, appearing sickle-like in flight with its long pointed wings and square tail, often resembling a swift when gliding with folded wings. It is fast and powerful in flight and will take large insects, such as dragonflies, which it transfers from talons to beak and eats while soaring slowly in circles. It also captures small bats and small birds in flight. Its speed and aerobatic skills enable it to take swallows and even swifts on the wing, and barn swallows or house martins have a characteristic "hobby" alarm call. It is known to harass swallows while they are roosting and dispersing from roosts. When not breeding, it is crepuscular, hawking principally in the mornings and evenings. While on migration, they may move in small groups.

Hobbies tend to nest in old nests of birds such as crows and rooks, typically having a single brood and laying 2–3 eggs from June to August. Incubation is said to take 28 days and both parents share in this duty, though the female does the greater part. The tree selected is most often one in a hedge or on the extreme edge of a spinney, from where the bird can observe intruders from a considerable distance.

The Eurasian hobby is perceived as a bold and courageous species, which was used in falconry, trained to hawk birds like quails, larks, hoopoes, drongos, etc.
