= Karamyshevo =

Karamyshevo (Russian: Карамышево) is the name of several rural localities in Russia:

- Karamyshevo, Altai Krai, a selo in Karamyshevsky Selsoviet of Zmeinogorsky District of Altai Krai
- Karamyshevo, Chuvash Republic, a selo in Karamyshevskoye Rural Settlement of Kozlovsky District of the Chuvash Republic
- Karamyshevo, Kaliningrad Oblast, a settlement in Gavrilovsky Rural Okrug of Ozyorsky District of Kaliningrad Oblast
- Karamyshevo, Kaluga Oblast, a village in Dzerzhinsky District of Kaluga Oblast
- Karamyshevo, Lipetsk Oblast, a selo in Karamyshevsky Selsoviet of Gryazinsky District of Lipetsk Oblast
- Karamyshevo, Moscow Oblast, a village in Kulikovskoye Rural Settlement of Dmitrovsky District of Moscow Oblast
- Karamyshevo, Pskov Oblast, a selo in Pskovsky District of Pskov Oblast
- Karamyshevo, Kasimovsky District, Ryazan Oblast, a selo in Akhmatovsky Rural Okrug of Kasimovsky District of Ryazan Oblast
- Karamyshevo, Starozhilovsky District, Ryazan Oblast, a village under the administrative jurisdiction of the work settlement of Starozhilovo in Starozhilovsky District of Ryazan Oblast
- Karamyshevo, Republic of Tatarstan, a selo in Cheremshansky District of the Republic of Tatarstan
- Karamyshevo, Shchyokinsky District, Tula Oblast, a selo in Karamyshevskaya Rural Administration of Shchyokinsky District of Tula Oblast
- Karamyshevo, Tyoplo-Ogaryovsky District, Tula Oblast, a village in Streshnevsky Rural Okrug of Tyoplo-Ogaryovsky District of Tula Oblast
- Karamyshevo, Tver Oblast, a village in Sandovsky District of Tver Oblast
- Karamyshevo, Voronezh Oblast, a settlement in Dankovskoye Rural Settlement of Kashirsky District of Voronezh Oblast
- Karamyshevo, Yaroslavl Oblast, a village in Novinkovsky Rural Okrug of Pervomaysky District of Yaroslavl Oblast
