= Bespalovsky =

Bespalovsky Беспаловский
- Settlement
- Location within Altai Krai Location within Russia
- Coordinates: 51°11′N 82°14′E
- Country: Russia
- Region: Altai Krai
- District: Zmeinogorsky District
- Time zone: UTC+7:00

Bespalovsky (Russian: Беспаловский) is a rural locality (a settlement) and the administrative center of Cherepanovsky Selsoviet, Zmeinogorsky District, Altai Krai, Russia. The population was 703 as of 2013. There are 12 streets.

== Geography ==
Bespalovsky is located 7 km northeast of Zmeinogorsk (the district's administrative centre) by road. Cherepanovsky is the nearest rural locality.
