= Otrada, Altai Krai =

Otrada Отрада
- Settlement
- Location within Altai Krai Location within Russia
- Coordinates: 51°18′N 81°47′E
- Country: Russia
- Region: Altai Krai
- District: Zmeinogorsky District
- Time zone: UTC+7:00

Otrada (Russian: Отрада) is a rural locality (a settlement) in Oktyabrsky Selsoviet, Zmeinogorsky District, Altai Krai, Russia. The population was 149 as of 2013. There are 2 streets.

== Geography ==
Otrada is located 48 km northwest of Zmeinogorsk (the district's administrative centre) by road. Oktyabrsky is the nearest rural locality.
