= Varshava, Altai Krai =

Varshava Варшава
- Settlement
- Location within Altai Krai Location within Russia
- Coordinates: 51°25′N 81°46′E
- Country: Russia
- Region: Altai Krai
- District: Zmeinogorsky District
- Founded: 1922

Population (2013)
  - Total: 35
- Time zone: UTC+7:00
- Postal code: 658476

Varshava (Russian: Варшава) is a rural locality (a settlement) in Nikolsky Selsoviet, Zmeinogorsky District, Altai Krai, Russia. It is part of the Nikolsky Selsoviet. There are 2 streets.

== History ==
Founded in 1922. In 1928 it consisted of 74 households with the main population being Russians. It was part of the Petrograd Selsoviet of Rubtsovsky raion of Rubtsovsky okrug in Siberian krai. In 1931, it consisted of 83 households and was still part of the same selsoviet in the same raion.

== Geography ==
Varshava is located 47 km northwest of Zmeinogorsk (the district's administrative centre) by road. Talovka and Nikolsk are the nearest rural localities.
