= Galtsovka =

Galtsovka Гальцовка
- Selo
- Location within Altai Krai Location within Russia
- Coordinates: 51°03′N 82°20′E
- Country: Russia
- Region: Altai Krai
- District: Zmeinogorsky District
- Time zone: UTC+7:00

Galtsovka (Russian: Гальцовка) is a rural locality (a selo) in Baranovsky Selsoviet, Zmeinogorsky District, Altai Krai, Russia. The population was 335 as of 2013. There are 7 streets.

== Geography ==
Galtsovka is located 24 km southeast of Zmeinogorsk (the district's administrative centre) by road. Lazurka is the nearest rural locality.
