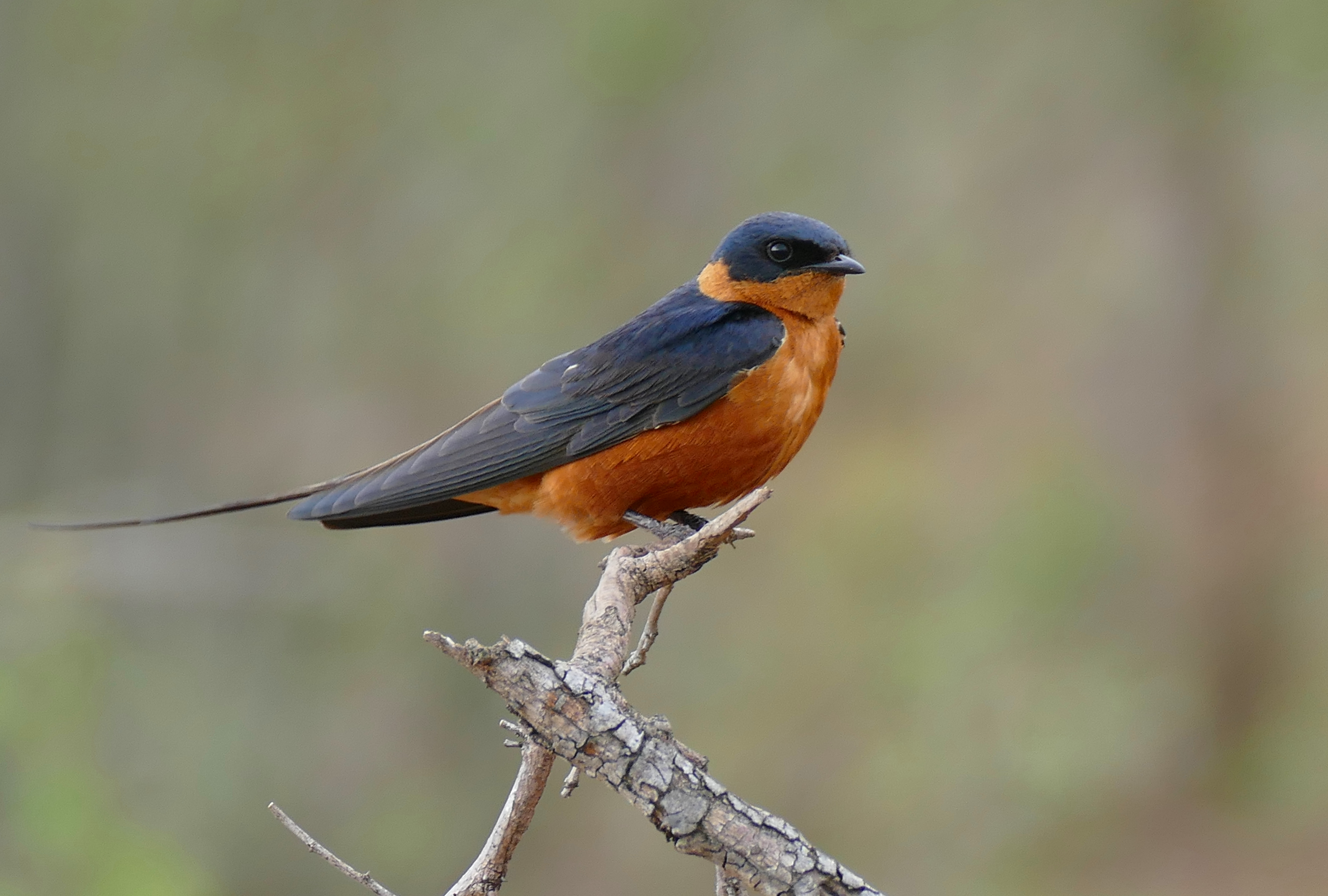
- In Kruger NP, Mpumalanga, South Africa

Conservation status
- Least Concern (IUCN 3.1)

Scientific classification
- Kingdom: Animalia
- Phylum: Chordata
- Class: Aves
- Order: Passeriformes
- Family: Hirundinidae
- Genus: Cecropis
- Species: C. semirufa

Binomial name
- Cecropis semirufa (Sundevall, 1850)

Synonyms
- Hirundo semirufa

= Red-breasted swallow =

Species of bird

The red-breasted swallow (Cecropis semirufa), also known as the rufous-chested swallow, is a member of the family Hirundinidae, found in Sub-Saharan Africa. It is confined to the tropical rainforest during the wet season.

== Description ==
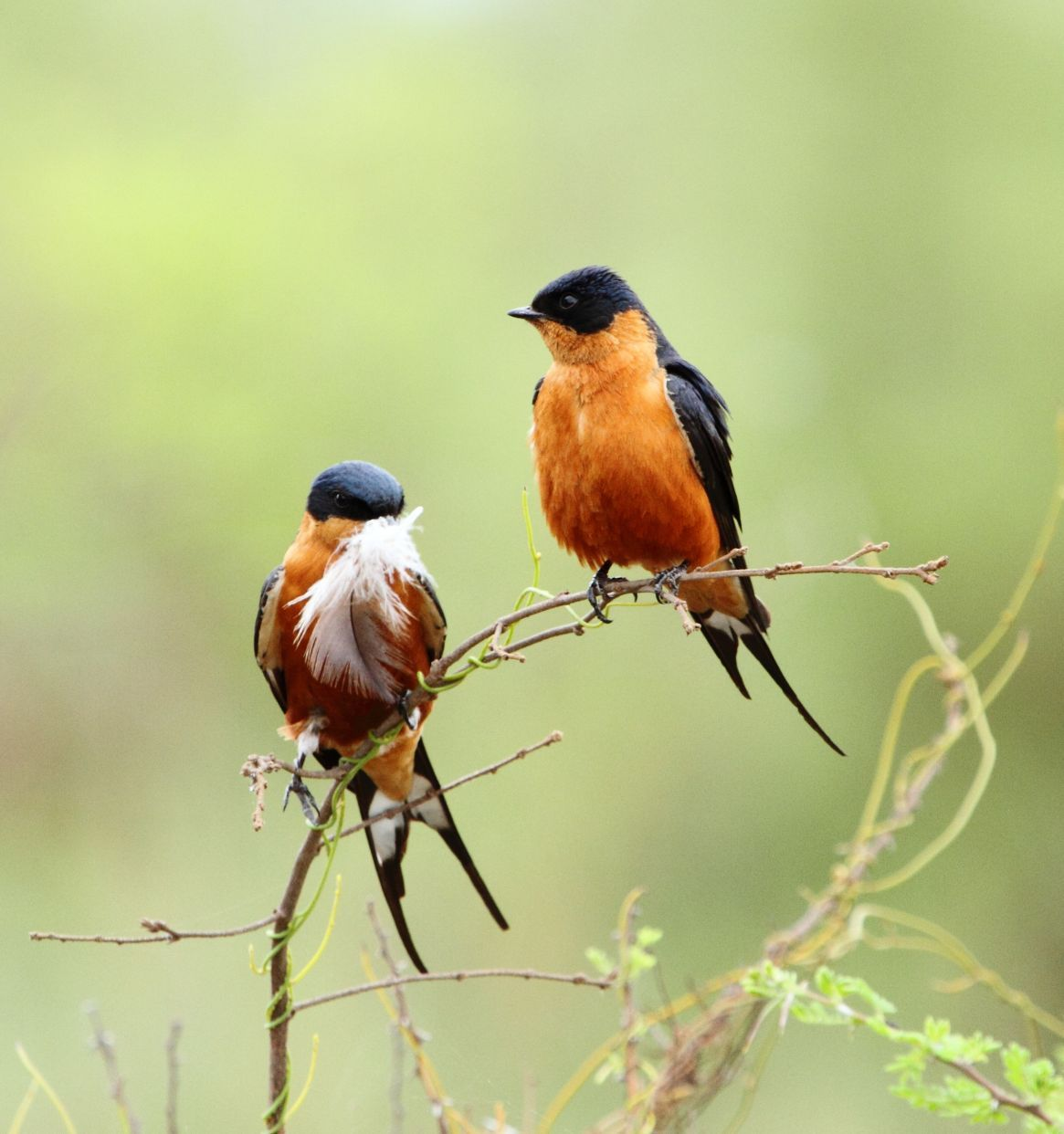
A pair near their nest in Kruger NP, South Africa

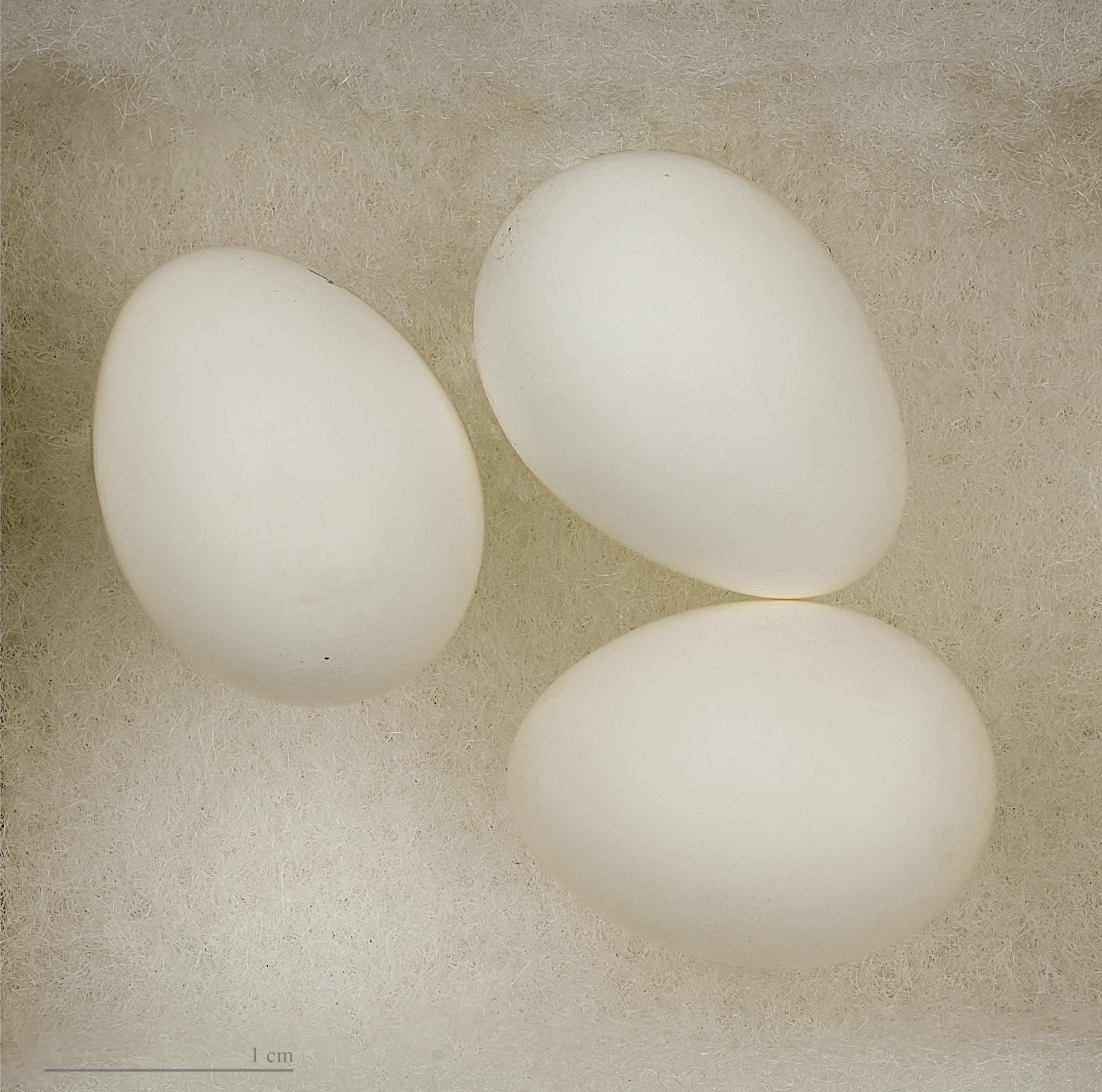
Eggs of Cecropis semirufa - MHNT

The red-breasted swallow is similar to the mosque swallow but is slightly smaller and has longer tail streamers, both species having a blue crown and mantle contrasting with a rufous rump and underparts, In the red-breasted swallow the dark crown extends below the eye and there is no white on the underwing. The juvenile is similar to the red-rumped swallow but has blue on the side of the head rather than dull red.

== Distribution and movements ==
The red-breasted swallow is found over most of Africa south of the Sahara from the Eastern Cape north to northern Namibia and southern Angola in the west and Mozambique in the east, with a disjunct range from Senegal south to northern Angola east to Uganda, southwestern Kenya and northwestern Tanzania.

The red-breasted swallow is migratory in most of its range. In southern Africa it is a summer visitor, nesting between July and March with most of the population migrating to equatorial Africa, although a few remain all year. In some parts of its range, e.g. in southeastern Nigeria to Gabon, it appears to be resident, but it is mostly a rainy season breeding visitor across its northern range.

== Habitat ==
The red-breasted swallow is a bird of dry open country. In more wooded areas it is replaced by the similar mosque swallow. It builds a closed mud nest with a tubular entrance in a cavity or under bridges and similar structures. It will use deserted buildings, tree holes or caves, and has benefited from the construction of railway bridges and similar structures.

== Biology ==
The red-breasted swallow is generally a solitary species and pairs rarely breed in groups. Three eggs are a typical clutch. These birds feed on insects which are almost all caught in the air and the species rarely lands on the ground, rather perching on wires and twigs. The typical flight is slow and buoyant. Like the closely related red-rumped and mosque swallows, the nests of the red-breasted swallow are often usurped by the white-rumped swift.

== Subspecies ==
There are two recognised subspecies.

- Cecropis semirufa gordoni is a smaller and slightly duller coloured subspecies found in the northern part of the species range.
- Cecropis semirufa semirufa is found in southern Africa.

The birds breeding in east Africa are intermediate and have been named as a potential third subspecies Cecropis semirufa neumanni.
