= Ryazanovka, Altai Krai =

Ryazanovka Рязановка
- Settlement
- Location within Altai Krai Location within Russia
- Coordinates: 51°03′N 82°16′E
- Country: Russia
- Region: Altai Krai
- District: Zmeinogorsky District
- Time zone: UTC+7:00

Ryazanovka (Russian: Рязановка) is a rural locality (a settlement) in Baranovsky Selsoviet, Zmeinogorsky District, Altai Krai, Russia. The population was 8 as of 2013. There is 1 street.

== Geography ==
Ryazanovka is located 18 km southeast of Zmeinogorsk (the district's administrative centre) by road. Baranovka is the nearest rural locality.
