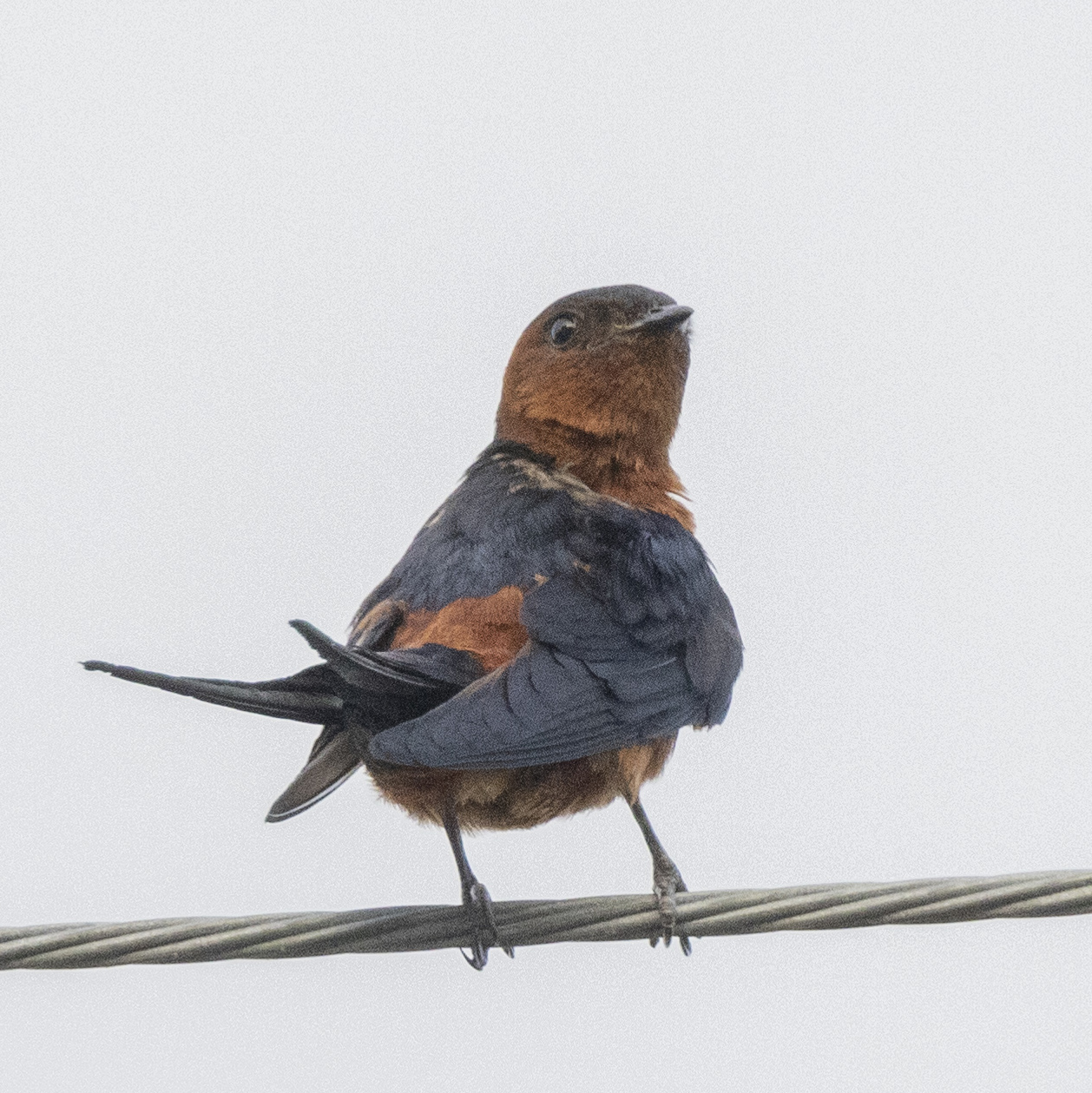
- 'Rufous-bellied swallow, Thailand

Conservation status
- Least Concern (IUCN 3.1)

Scientific classification
- Kingdom: Animalia
- Phylum: Chordata
- Class: Aves
- Order: Passeriformes
- Family: Hirundinidae
- Genus: Cecropis
- Species: C. badia

Binomial name
- Cecropis badia Cassin, 1853

Synonyms
- Hirundo badia

= Rufous-bellied swallow =

Species of bird

The rufous-bellied swallow (Cecropis badia) is a species of swallow that breeds on the Malay Peninsula. It has faintly streaked deep rufous underparts, and an unstreaked rump. It is usually raised to species status from its closest relative, the striated swallow.
