= Cherepanovsky (rural locality) =

Cherepanovsky Черепановский
- Settlement
- Location within Altai Krai Location within Russia
- Coordinates: 51°11′N 82°18′E
- Country: Russia
- Region: Altai Krai
- District: Zmeinogorsky District
- Time zone: UTC+7:00

Cherepanovsky (Russian: Черепановский) is a rural locality (a settlement) in Cherepanovsky Selsoviet, Zmeinogorsky District, Altai Krai, Russia. The population was 365 as of 2013. There are 3 streets.

== Geography ==
Cherepanovsky is located 12 km northeast of Zmeinogorsk (the district's administrative centre) by road. Bespalovsky is the nearest rural locality.
