= Cherepanovsky =

Cherepanovsky (masculine), Cherepanovskaya (feminine), or Cherepanovskoye (neuter) may refer to:

- Cherepanovsky District, a district of Novosibirsk Oblast, Russia
- Cherepanovsky (rural locality), a rural locality (a settlement) in Altai Krai, Russia
