= Karamyshevo, Altai Krai =

Karamyshevo Карамышево
- Selo
- Location within Altai Krai Location within Russia
- Coordinates: 51°10′N 82°05′E
- Country: Russia
- Region: Altai Krai
- District: Zmeinogorsky District
- Time zone: UTC+7:00

Karamyshevo (Russian: Карамышево) is a rural locality (a selo) and the administrative center of Karamyshevsky Selsoviet, Zmeinogorsky District, Altai Krai, Russia. The population was 1,126 as of 2013. There are 23 streets.

== Geography ==
Karamyshevo is located 8 km west of Zmeinogorsk (the district's administrative centre) by road. Voronezh and Zmeinogorsk are the nearest rural localities.
