= Lazurka =

Lazurka Лазурка
- Village
- Location within Altai Krai Location within Russia
- Coordinates: 51°05′38″N 82°22′52″E
- Country: Russia
- Region: Altai Krai
- District: Zmeinogorsky District
- Time zone: UTC+7:00

Lazurka (Russian: Лазурка) is a rural locality (a selo) in Zmeinogorsky District, Altai Krai, Russia. The population was 169 as of 2016. There are 9 streets.

== Geography ==
Lazurka is located on the right bank of the Bolshaya Goltsovka River, 28 km southeast of Zmeinogorsk (the district's administrative centre) by road. Galtsovka is the nearest rural locality.

== Ethnicity ==
The village is inhabited by Russians and others.
