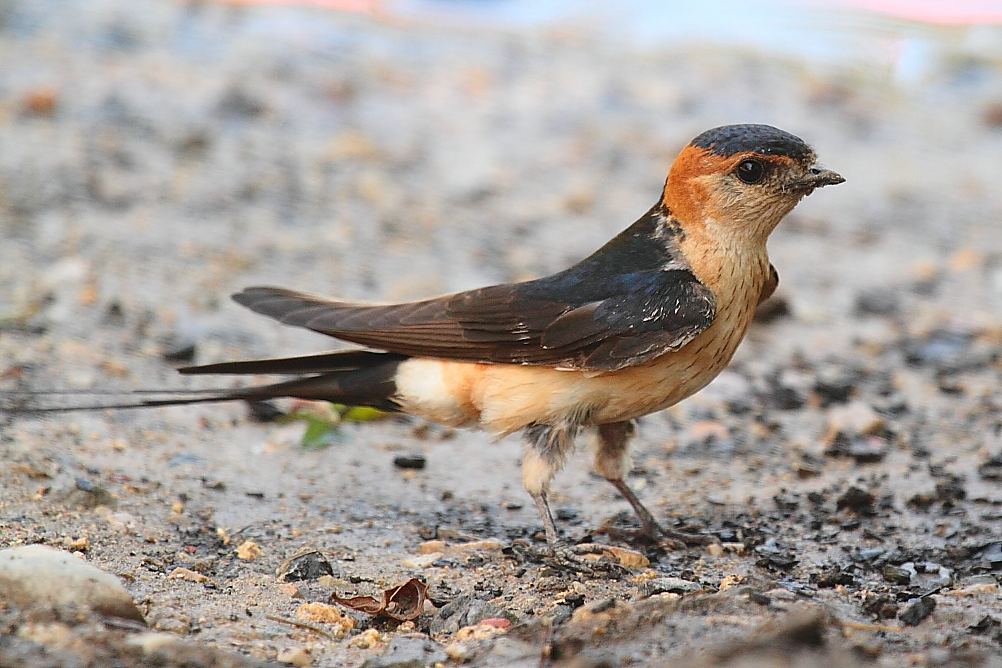
- Red-rumped Swallow (Cecropis rufula)

Scientific classification
- Kingdom: Animalia
- Phylum: Chordata
- Class: Aves
- Order: Passeriformes
- Family: Hirundinidae
- Subfamily: Hirundininae
- Genus: Cecropis; F. Boie, 1826

Type species
- Hirundo capensis J. F. Gmelin, 1789

Species
- See text

Synonyms
- Lillia

= Cecropis =

Genus of birds

Cecropis is a genus of large swallows found in Africa and tropical Asia. The red-rumped swallow's range also extends into southern Europe, and (in small numbers) into Australia. This genus is frequently subsumed into the larger genus Hirundo.

The swallow family Hirundinidae consists of 92 bird species which typically hunt insects in flight. The two river martins have long been recognised as very distinctive, and are placed in a separate subfamily, Pseudochelidoninae, leaving all other swallows and martins in the Hirundininae. DNA studies suggest that there are three major groupings within the Hirundininae subfamily, broadly correlating with the type of nest built. The groups are the "core martins" including burrowing species like the sand martin, the "nest-adopters", with birds like the tree swallow which use natural cavities, and the "mud nest builders". The Cecropsis species construct a closed mud nest and therefore belong to the latter group. It is believed that the evolutionary sequence is from species that make open cup nests (Hirundo and Ptyonoprogne), through Delichon house martins with closed nests, to Cecropis and Petrochelidon, which have retort-like closed nests with an entrance tunnel.

The genus Cecropis was introduced by the German zoologist Friedrich Boie in 1826. The type species was subsequently designated as the greater striped swallow (Cecropis cucullata) by the Italian zoologist Tommaso Salvadori in 1881. The name of the genus is from the Ancient Greek Kekropis "Athenian woman".

== Species ==
The nine species in the genus are:

Image	Scientific name	Common name	Distribution
	Cecropis cucullata	Greater striped swallow	southern Africa, mainly in South Africa, Namibia and southern Zimbabwe. It is migratory wintering further north in Angola, Tanzania and southern Democratic Republic of the Congo.
	Cecropis rufula	European red-rumped swallow (split from C. daurica)	south Europe and north Africa east to Iran, Pakistan and northwest India
	Cecropis daurica	Eastern red-rumped swallow (formerly red-rumped swallow before lump of striated swallow C. striolata and splits of C. rufula and C. melanocrissus)	South and Southeast Asia to northeastern India and Taiwan
	Cecropis melanocrissus	African red-rumped swallow (split from C. daurica, includes West African swallow C. domicella)	Africa
	Cecropis hyperythra	Sri Lanka swallow	Sri Lanka
	Cecropis badia	Rufous-bellied swallow	Malay Peninsula
	Cecropis abyssinica	Lesser striped swallow	Sub-Saharan Africa from Sierra Leone and southern Sudan south into eastern South Africa.
	Cecropis semirufa	Red-breasted swallow	Sahara from the Eastern Cape north to northern Namibia and southern Angola in the west and Mozambique in the east, with a disjunct range from Senegal south to northern Angola east to Uganda, south western Kenya and north western Tanzania
	Cecropis senegalensis	Mosque swallow	southern Mauritania and Senegal east to western South Sudan then south to Namibia, northern Botswana, Zimbabwe, Mozambique and north eastern South Africa.
