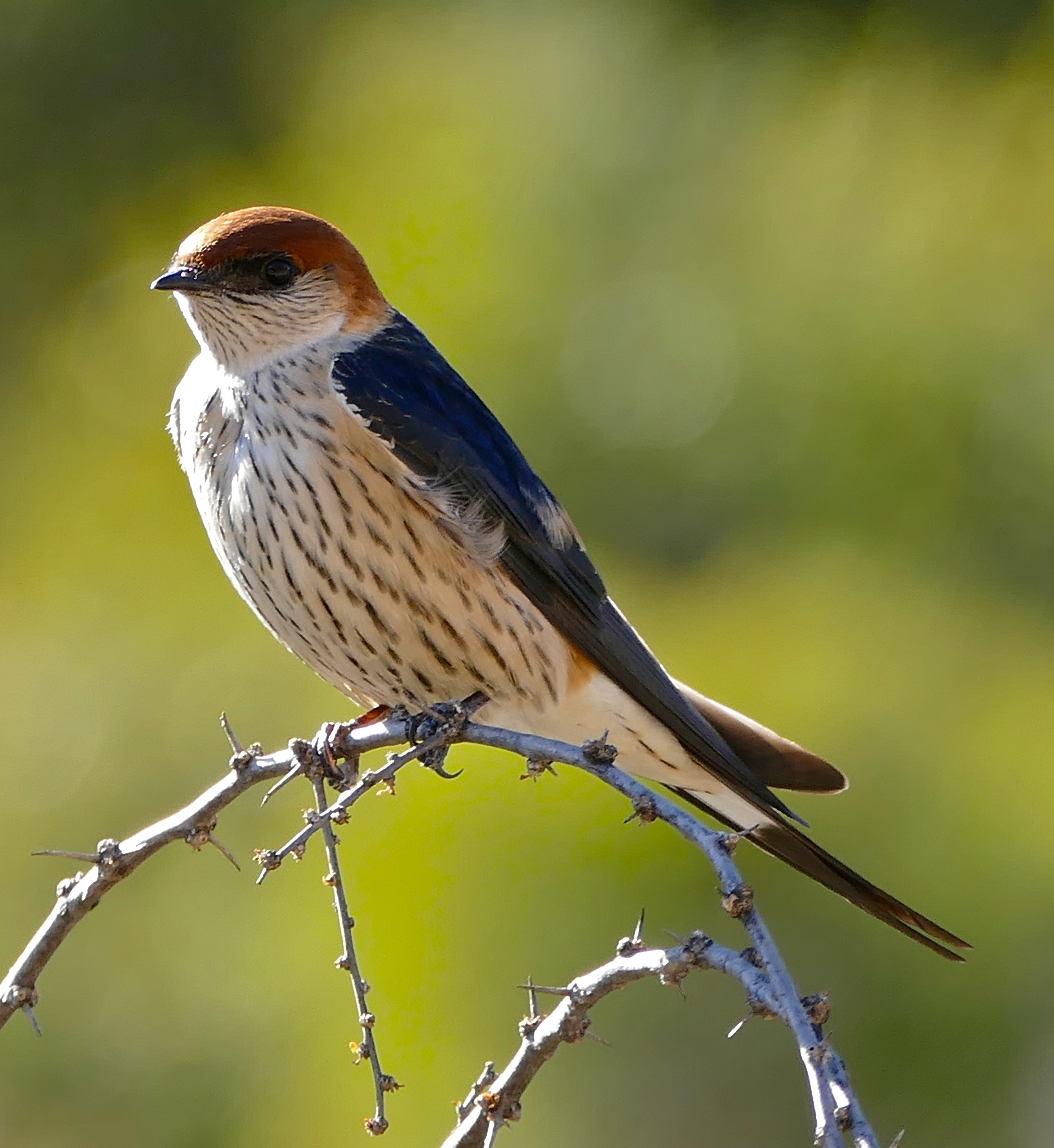
- Perched in Camdeboo National Park, and calls from a gulp prior to migration from Pretoria

Conservation status
- Least Concern (IUCN 3.1)

Scientific classification
- Kingdom: Animalia
- Phylum: Chordata
- Class: Aves
- Order: Passeriformes
- Family: Hirundinidae
- Genus: Cecropis
- Species: C. cucullata

Binomial name
- Cecropis cucullata (Boddaert, 1783)
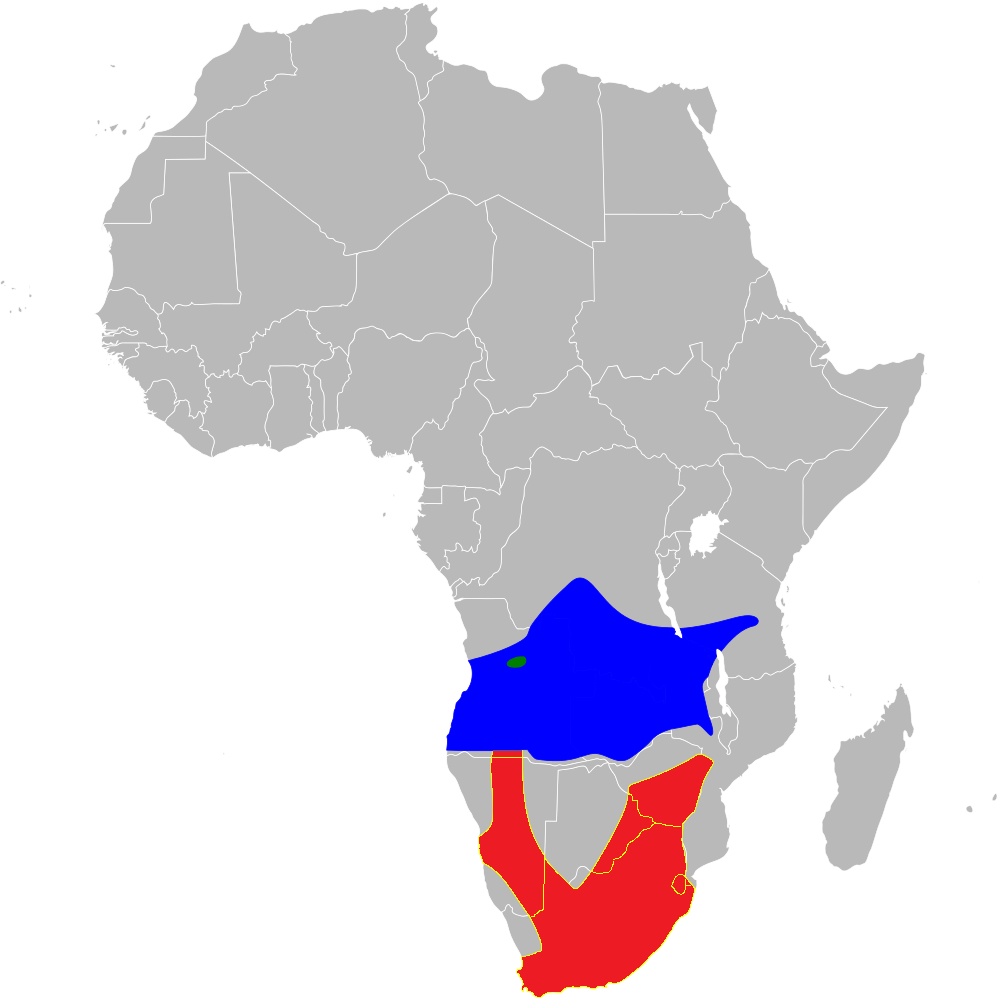
- range whole year resident (very locally) breeding summer visitor overwintering visitor

Synonyms
- Hirundo cucullata

= Greater striped swallow =

Species of bird

The greater striped swallow (Cecropis cucullata) is a large swallow that is native to Africa south of the equator.

== Taxonomy ==
The greater striped swallow was described by the French polymath Georges-Louis Leclerc, Comte de Buffon in 1780 in his Histoire Naturelle des Oiseaux from a specimen collected in the Cape of Good Hope district of South Africa. The bird was also illustrated in a hand-coloured plate engraved by François-Nicolas Martinet in the Planches Enluminées D'Histoire Naturelle which was produced under the supervision of Edme-Louis Daubenton to accompany Buffon's text. Neither the plate caption nor Buffon's description included a scientific name but in 1783 the Dutch naturalist Pieter Boddaert coined the binomial name Hirundo cucullata in his catalogue of the Planches Enluminées. The greater striped swallow is now one of nine species that are placed in the genus Cecropis that was introduced by the German zoologist Friedrich Boie in 1826. The species is monotypic and no subspecies are recognised. The name of the genus is from the Ancient Greek Kekropis "Athenian woman". The specific epithet cucullata is from the Late Latin cucullatus meaning "hooded".

== Description ==
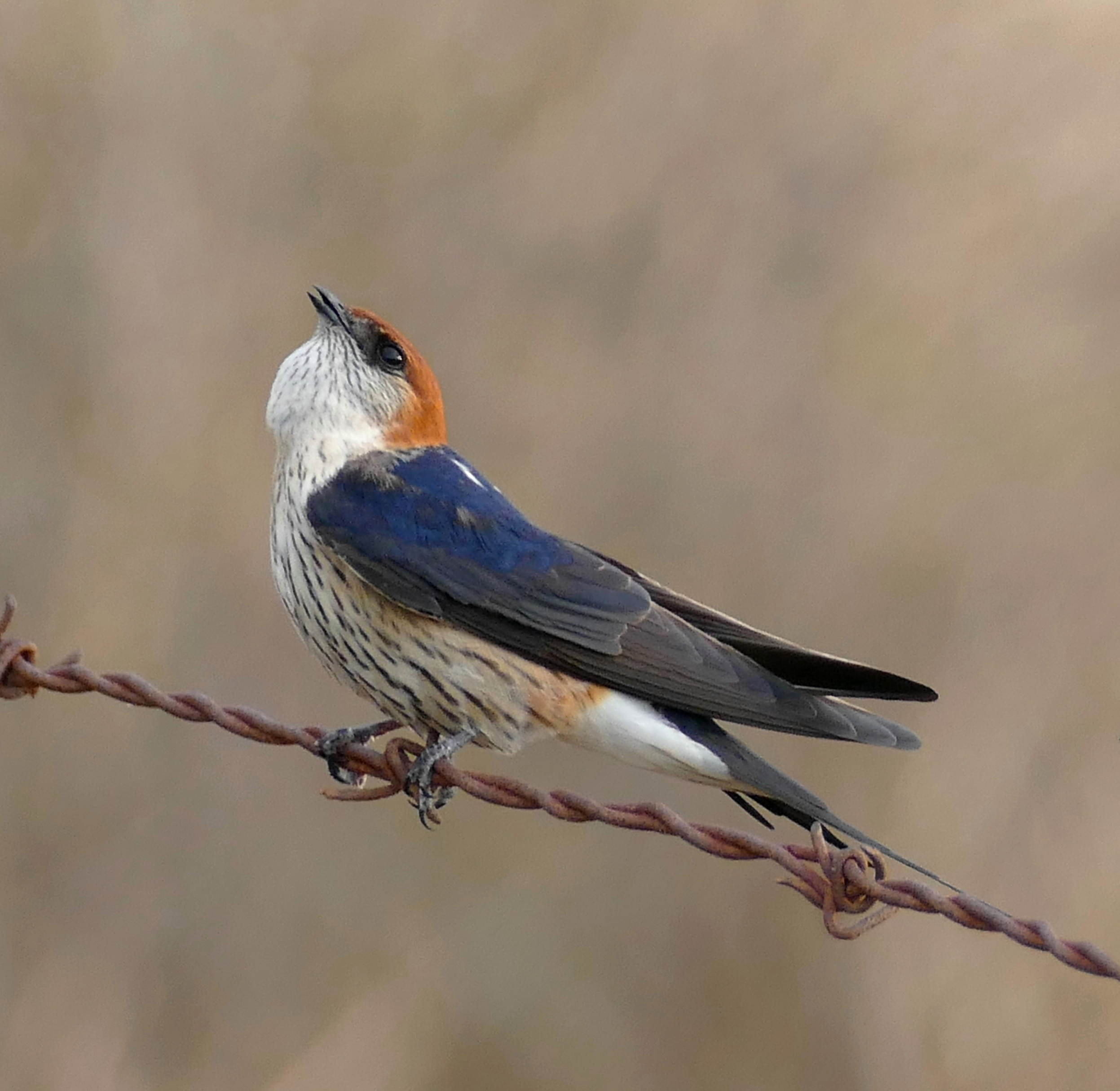
Calling from fence

The greater striped swallow is 18–20 cm (7.1–7.9 in) long. It has dark blue upperparts with a pale orange rump and a chestnut crown, nape and sides of the head. The underparts and underwing coverts are creamy white with dark streaking, and the upper wings and underwing flight feathers are blackish-brown. The blackish tail has very long outer feathers; these are slightly longer in the male than the female. Juveniles are duller and browner, with less contrast and shorter outer tail feathers. The flight is slow and buoyant, and the call is a twittering chissick.

This species can be distinguished from the smaller lesser striped swallow, Cecropis abyssinica, in that the latter species has heavier and darker underparts striping, a deeper red rump, and rufous rather than buffy ear coverts. The lesser striped swallow also prefers less open habitats.

== Distribution and habitat ==
It breeds in southern Africa, mainly in South Africa, Namibia and southern Zimbabwe. It is migratory wintering further north in Angola, Tanzania and southern Democratic Republic of the Congo.

== Behaviour and ecology ==
The greater striped swallow is common, unafraid of humans, and has benefited from the availability of nest sites around habitation. It feeds mainly on flying insects, but has been known to eat small fruits. It is a bird of dry open country, such as grassland, and has a preference for hills and mountains. It avoids more wooded areas, but is often found around human habitation.

== Breeding ==
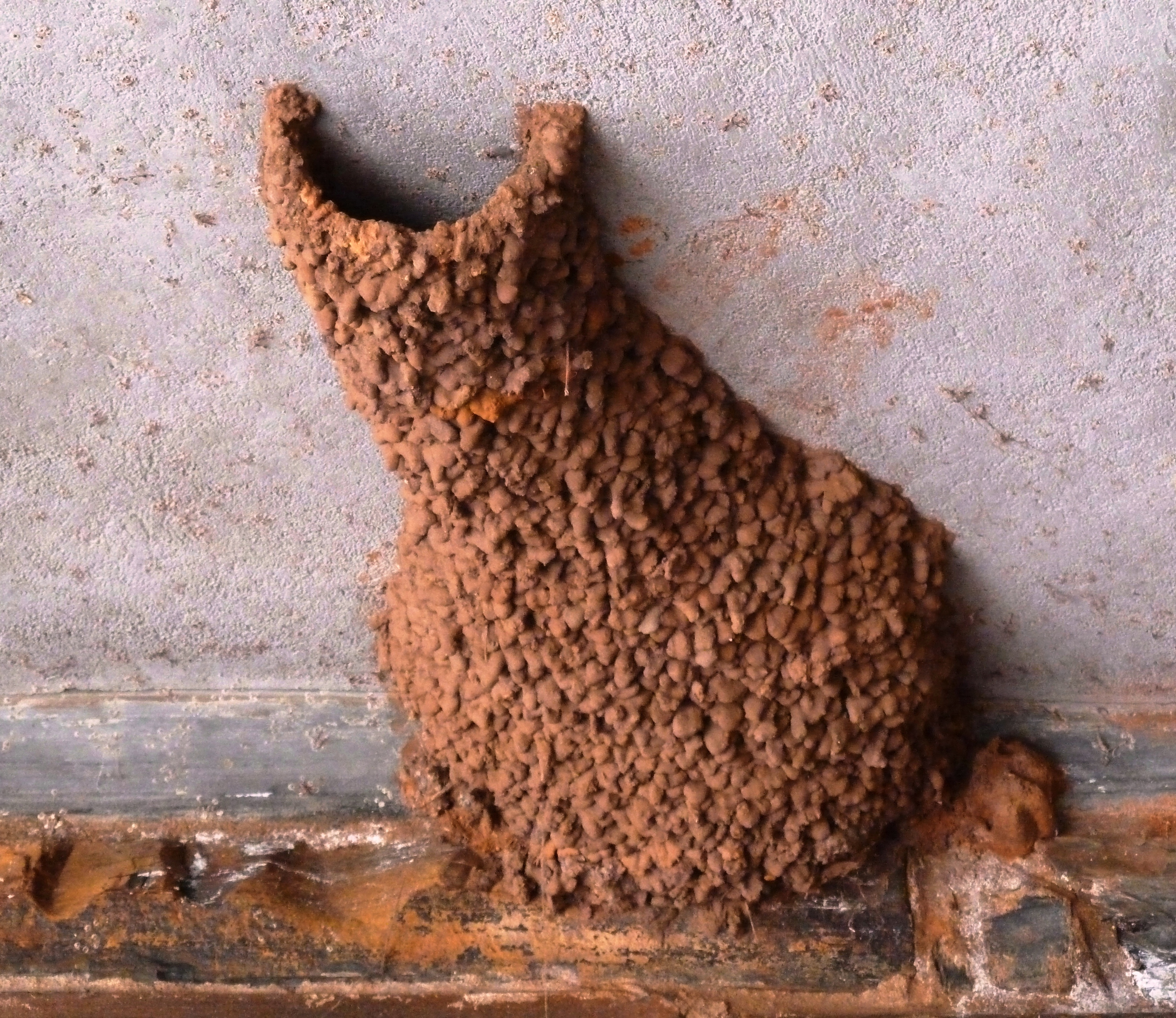
Nest built of mud pellets

The greater striped swallow builds a bowl-shaped mud nest with a tubular entrance on the underside of a suitable structure. The nest has a soft lining, and is often reused in later years. The nest may be built in a cave or under a rock overhang or fallen tree. This species has benefited from its willingness to use buildings, bridges, culverts and similar man-made structures. Given the choice, it will select a high nest site.

The eggs are glossy white with a few brown spots; three eggs are a typical clutch. Incubation is by the female alone for 17 to 20 days to hatching. Both parents then feed the chicks. Fledging takes another 23 to 30 days, but the young birds will return to the nest to roost for a few days after the first flight.
