= Korbalikhinskoye mine =

Lead mine in Russia

Korbalihinskoye mine
- Location within Russia
- Location: Novosibirsk Oblast, Russia; 51°11′N 82°13′E
- Products: Lead, Zinc

The Korbalihinskoye mine is one of the largest lead mines in Russia, located in Zmeinogorsky District, Altai Krai. The mine is located in southern Russia in Novosibirsk Oblast. The mine has reserves amounting to 24.5 million tonnes of ore grading 2.01% lead, 9.8% zinc and 43.5 million oz of silver.
