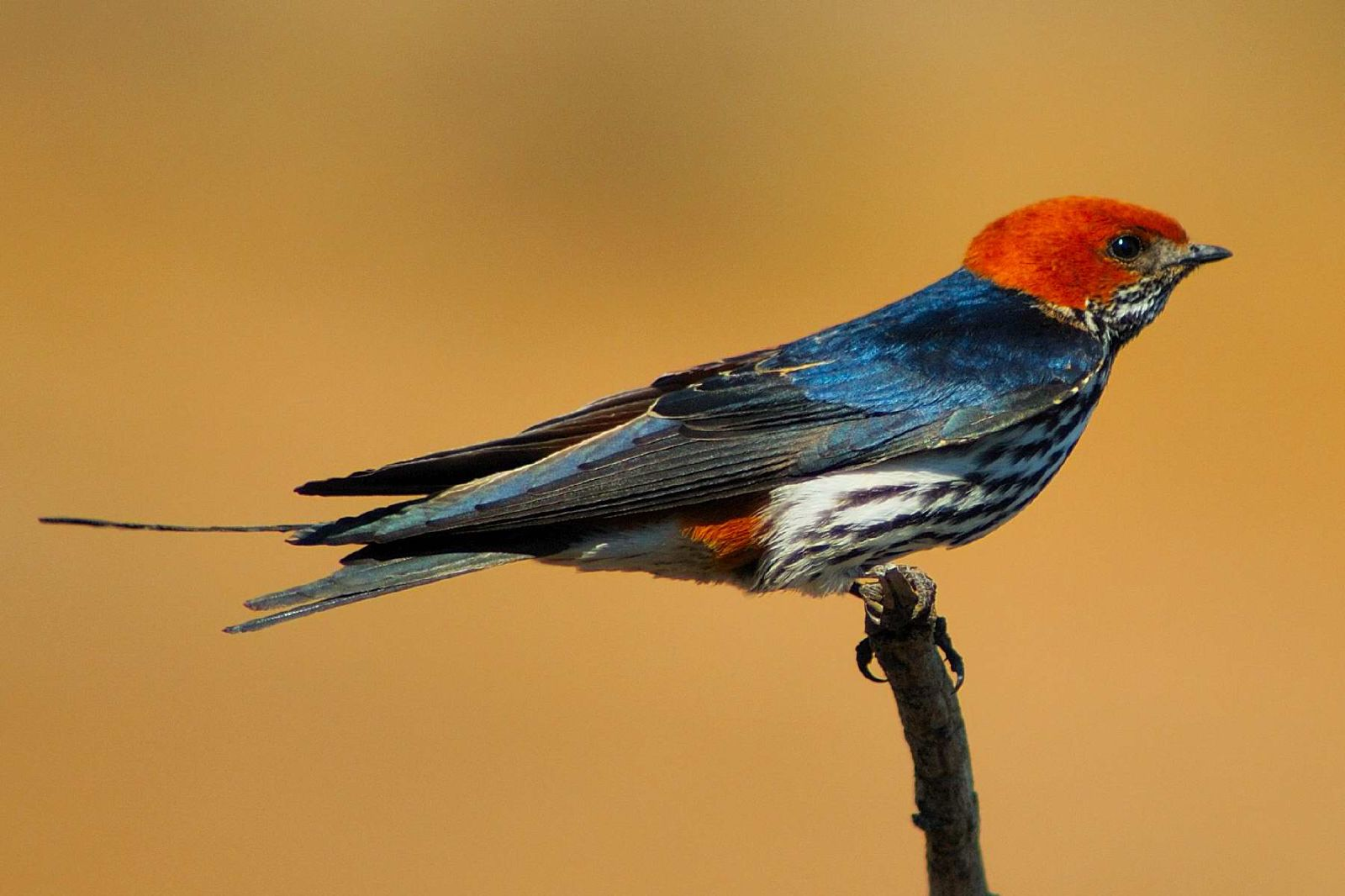
- In South Africa

Conservation status
- Least Concern (IUCN 3.1)

Scientific classification
- Kingdom: Animalia
- Phylum: Chordata
- Class: Aves
- Order: Passeriformes
- Family: Hirundinidae
- Genus: Cecropis
- Species: C. abyssinica

Binomial name
- Cecropis abyssinica (Guérin-Méneville, 1843)
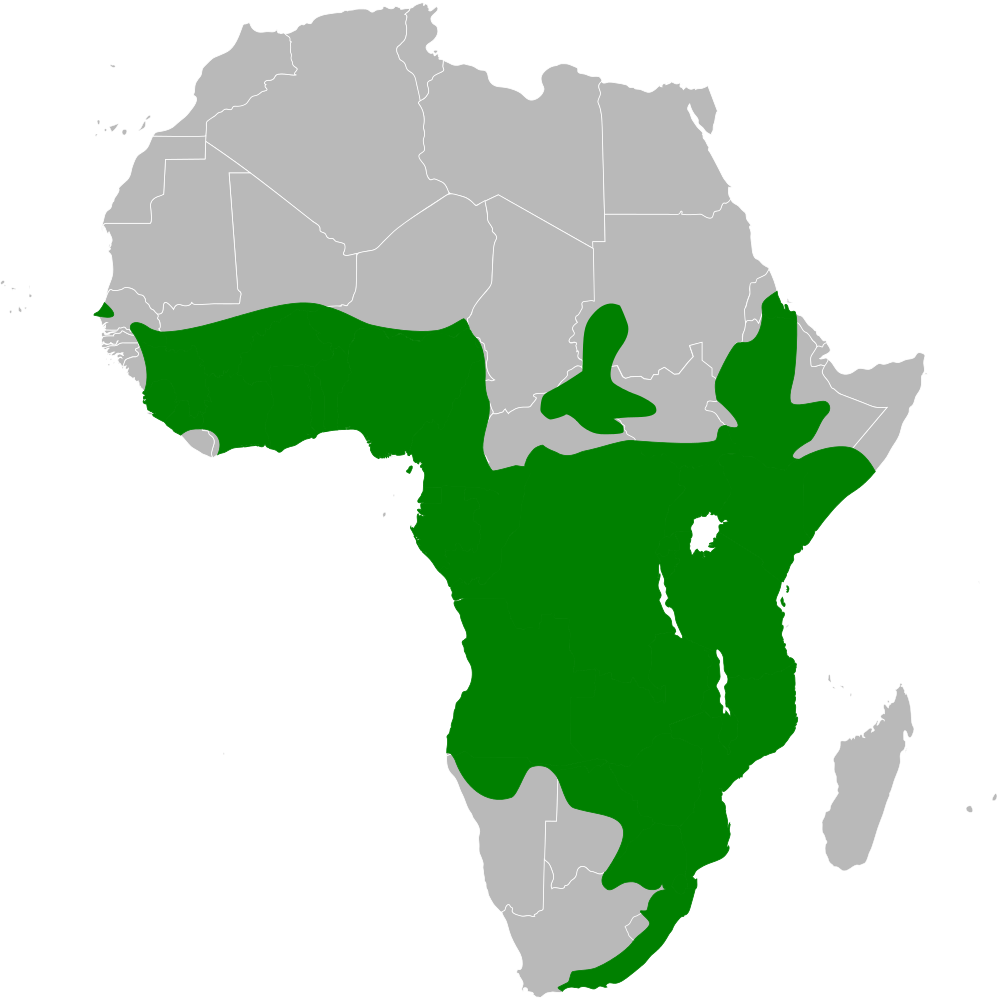
- approximate range

Synonyms
- Hirundo abyssinica

Audio
- Song recorded in the Masai Mara Game Reserve, Kenya

= Lesser striped swallow =

Species of bird

The lesser striped swallow (Cecropis abyssinica) is a large swallow. It breeds in Sub-Saharan Africa from Sierra Leone and southern Sudan south into eastern South Africa. It is partially migratory with South African birds wintering further north. West African birds leave the north of the breeding range in the dry season.

== Habitat ==
This is a bird of wooded, mainly lowland habitats. The lesser striped swallow prefers less open habitats, and is replaced in montane grassland by the greater striped swallow, Hirundo cucullata. It is common and often found around human habitation.

== Description ==
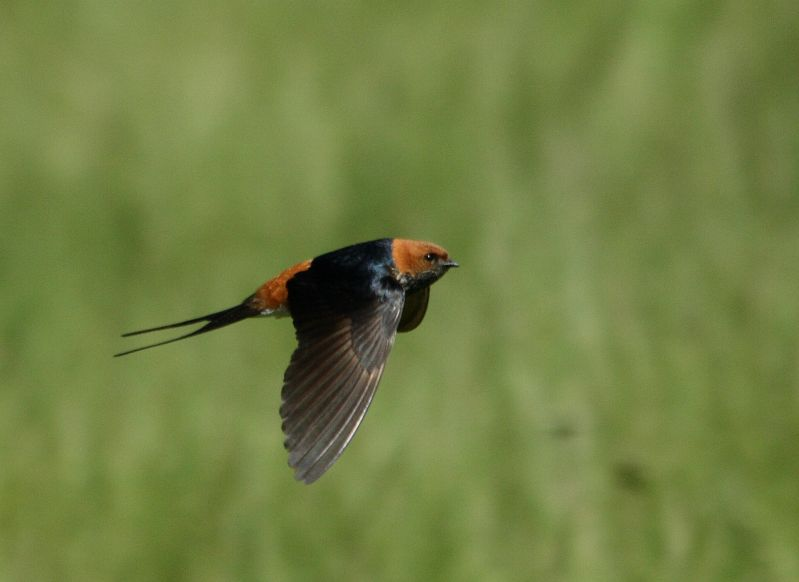
H. a. unitatis in flight in KwaZulu-Natal

The lesser striped swallow is 15–19 cm long. It has dark blue upperparts with a red rump and a rufous-chestnut crown, nape and sides of the head. The underparts are white with dark streaking, and the upper wings and underwing flight feathers are blackish-brown. The underwing coverts are tawny. The blackish tail has very long outer feathers; these are slightly longer in the male than the female. Juveniles are duller and browner, with less contrast and shorter outer tail feathers. There are five or six subspecies differing in the extent of the underpart streaking.

The lesser striped swallow has heavier and darker underparts striping, a deeper red rump, and a brighter head colour than the larger greater striped swallow.

== Distribution ==
The species is endemic to Sub-Saharan Africa and is relatively sedentary. A single record is known for Oman, and, from May 2025, one in Kuwait, the first for the Western Palaearctic.

== Behavior ==
It feeds mainly on flying insects, but has been known to eat small fruits. The flight is erratic, and the call is a nasal zeh zeh zeh zeh zeh.

=== Breeding ===
The lesser striped swallow builds a bowl-shaped mud nest with a tubular entrance on the underside of a suitable structure. The nest has a soft lining, and may be reused in later years. The nest may be built in a cave, under a rock overhang or a tree branch. This species has benefited from its willingness to use buildings, bridges, culverts and similar structures. Given the choice, it will select a high nest site.

The eggs are glossy white sometimes with a few brown spots; three eggs are a typical clutch. Incubation is by the female alone for 14–16 days to hatching. Both parents then feed the chicks. Fledging takes another 17–19 days, but the young birds will return to the nest to roost for a few days after their first flight.

== Gallery ==
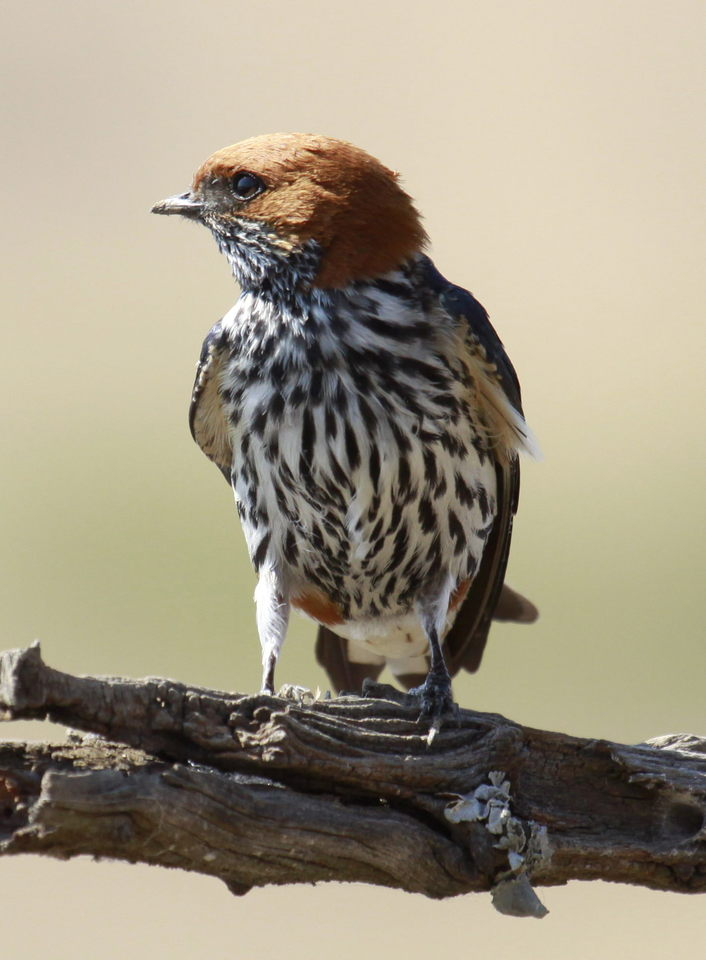
The heavy streaking and rufous ear coverts are diagnostic field marks

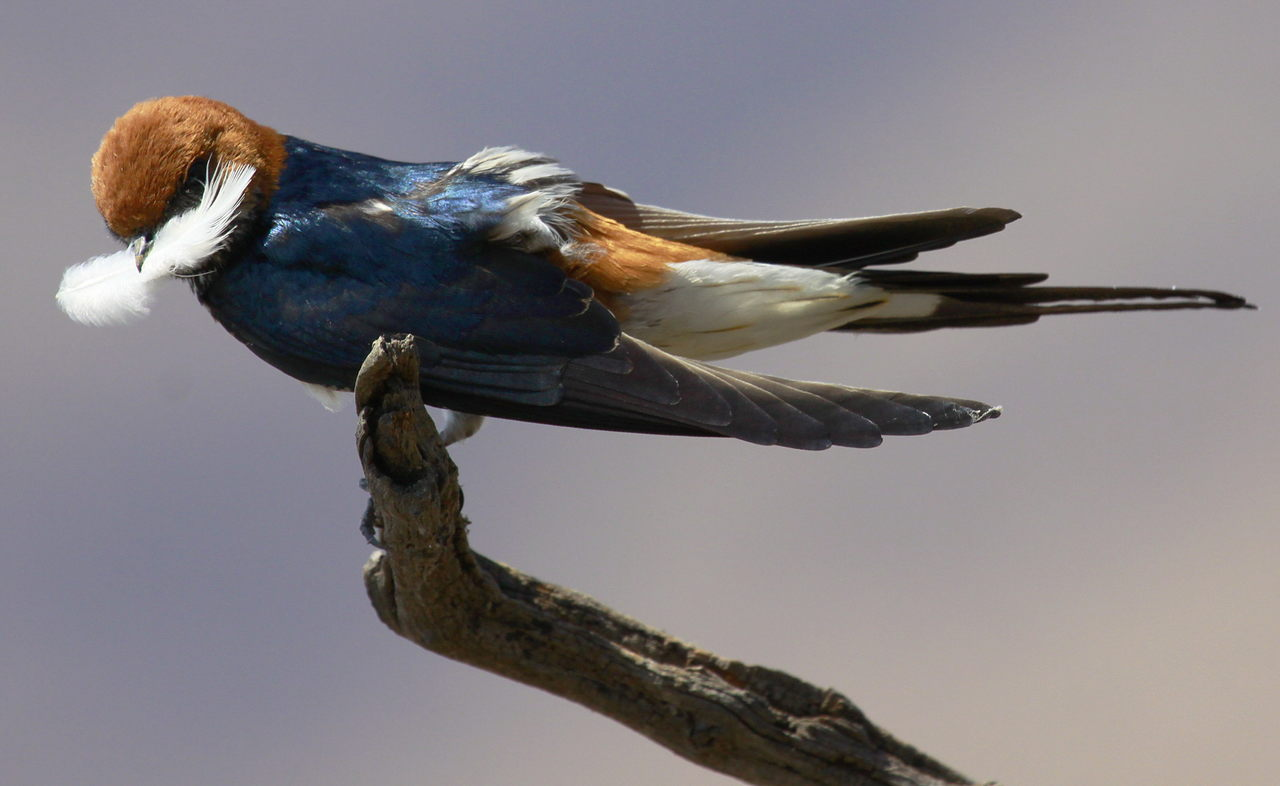
Adult with nest lining

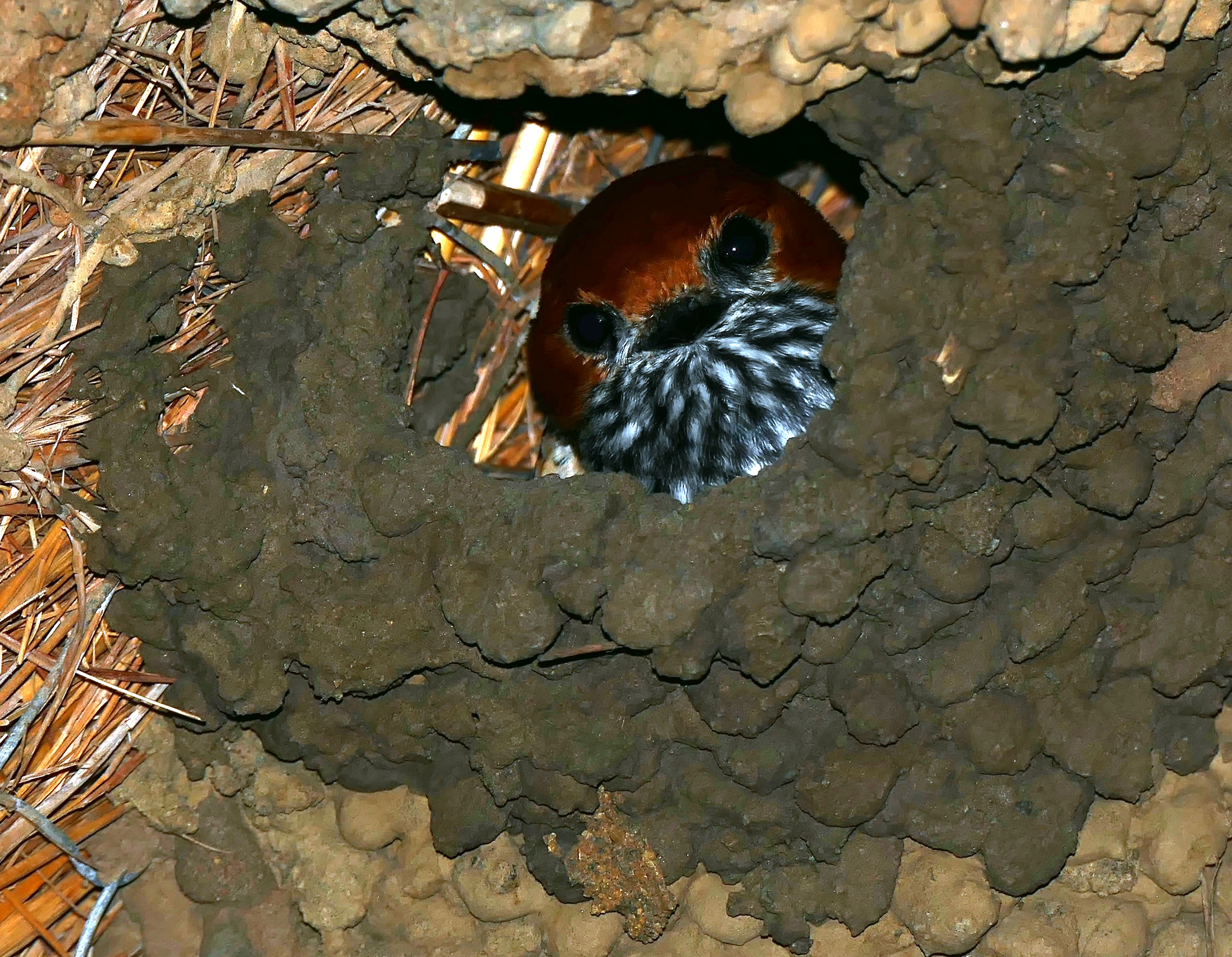
Completing nest

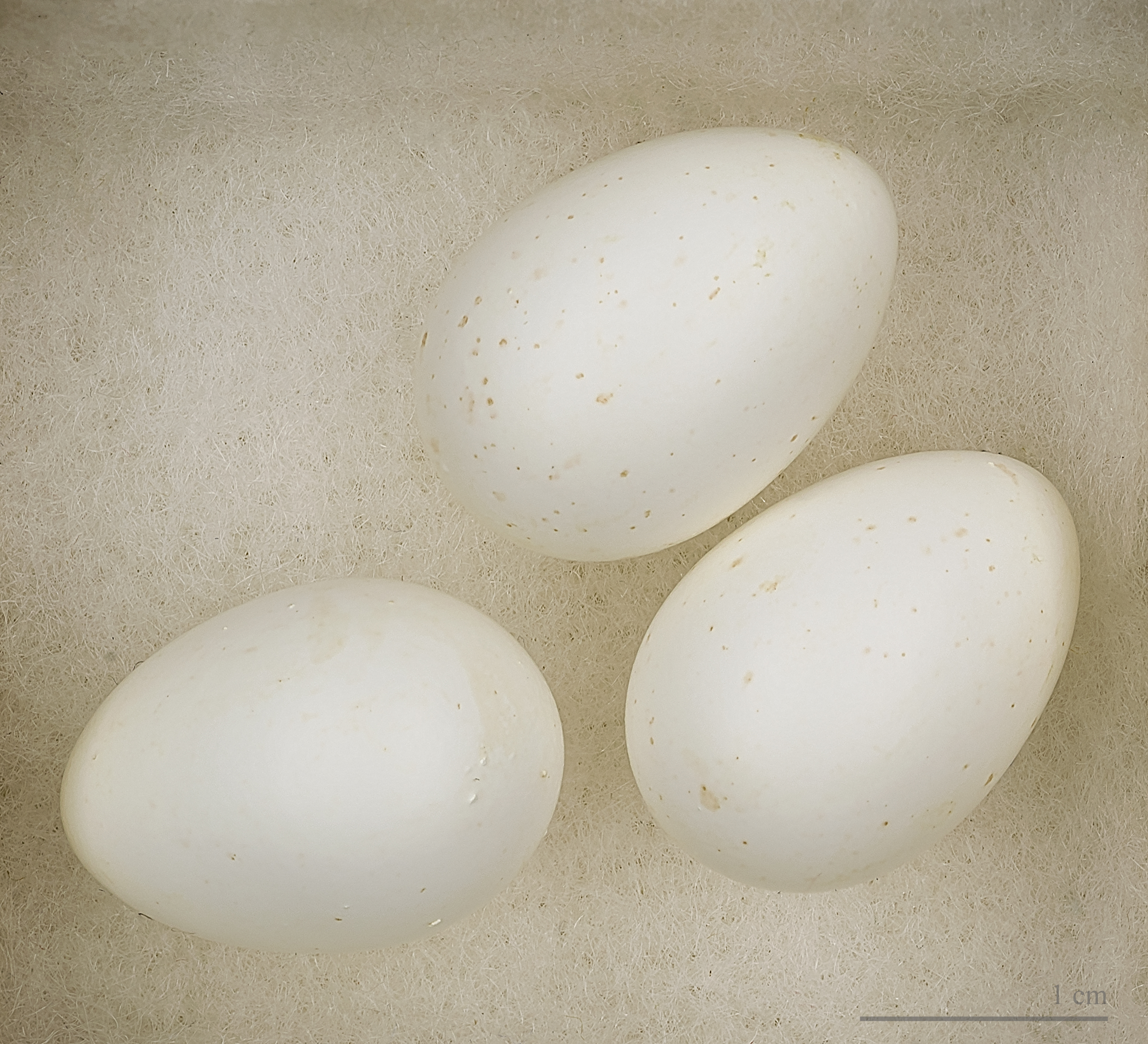
Glossy white eggs
