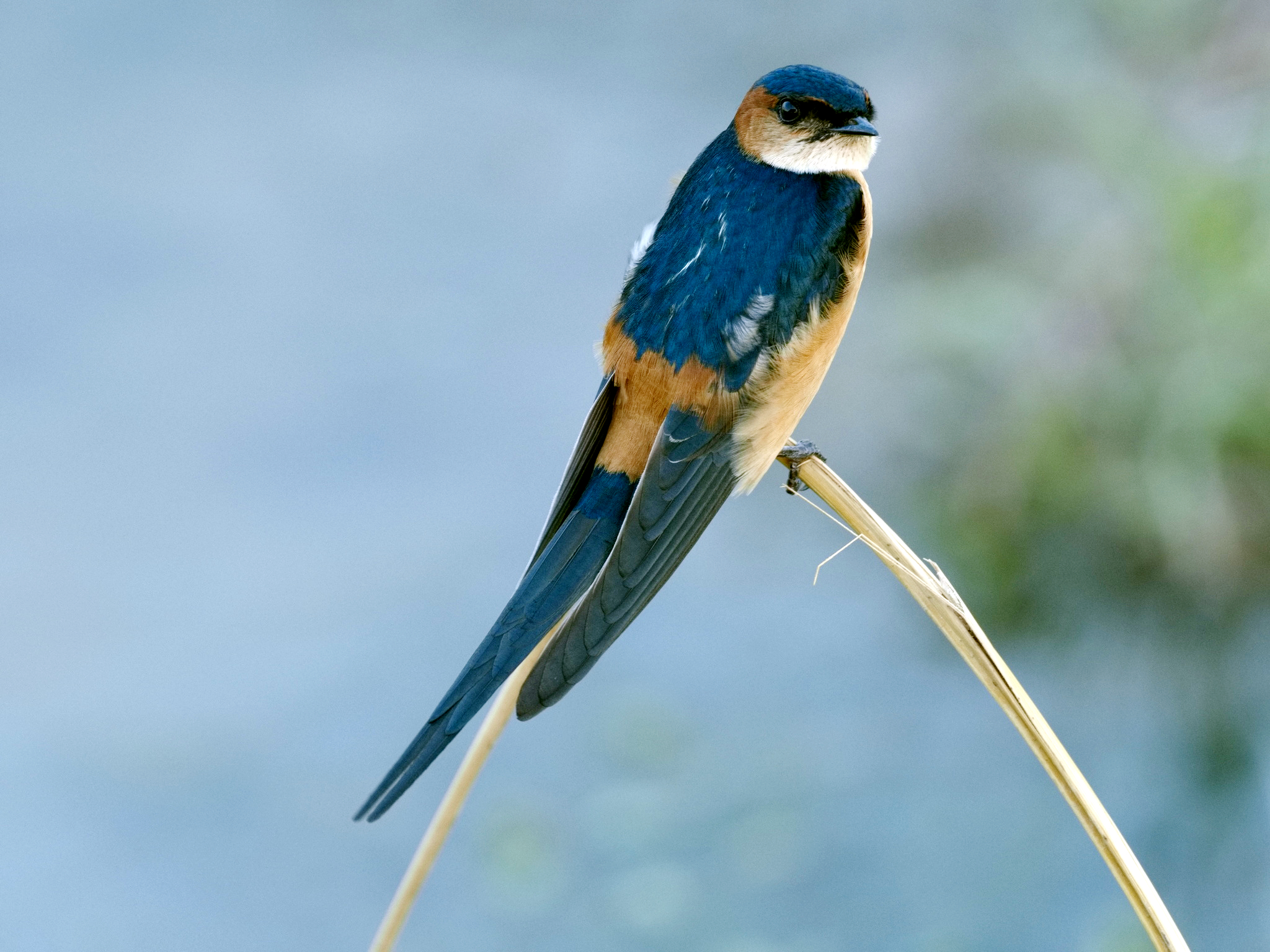
- Cecropis melanocrissus emini, Amboseli National Park, Kenya

Scientific classification
- Kingdom: Animalia
- Phylum: Chordata
- Class: Aves
- Order: Passeriformes
- Family: Hirundinidae
- Genus: Cecropis
- Species: C. melanocrissus

Binomial name
- Cecropis melanocrissus Rüppell, 1845

= African red-rumped swallow =

Species of bird

The African red-rumped swallow (Cecropis melanocrissus) is small passerine bird in the swallow family Hirundinidae. It is found in north tropical areas of Africa south of the Sahara.

== Taxonomy ==
The African red-rumped swallow was formally described and illustrated in 1845 by the German naturalist Eduard Rüppell based on a specimen collected in the Tembien region of northern Ethiopia. He coined the binomial name Cecropis melanocrissus where the specific epithet combines the Latin melas, melanos meaning "black" with Modern Latin crissum meaning "vent".

Four subspecies are recognised:

- C. m. domicella (Heuglin, 1869) – west Africa from Senegambia to east Sudan
- C. m. melanocrissus Rüppell, 1845 – Ethiopia and Eritrea
- C. m. kumboensis (Bannerman, 1923) – Sierra Leone and west Cameroon
- C. m. emini (Reichenow, 1892) – southeast Sudan, Uganda and Kenya to Malawi and north Zambia

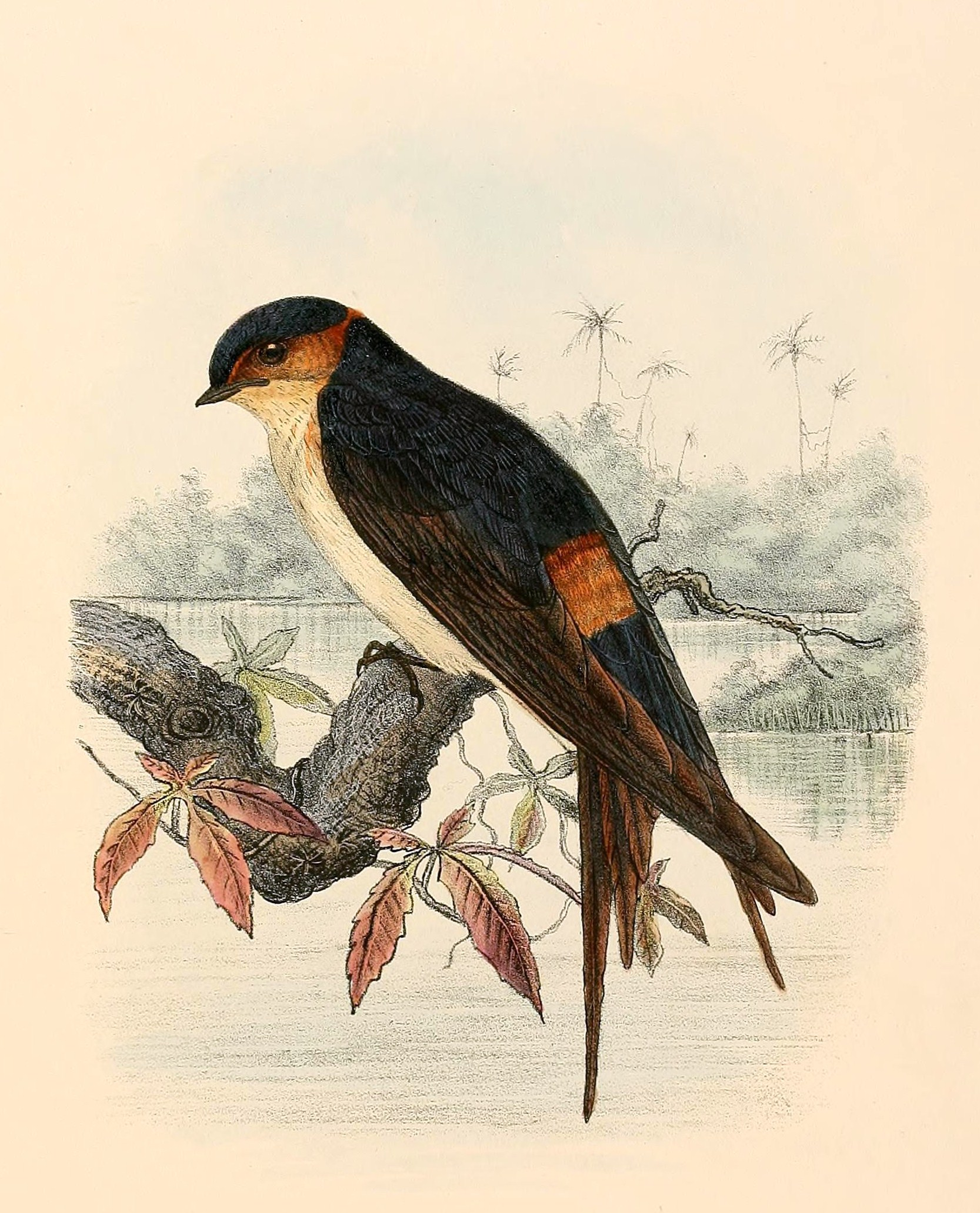
The West African C. m. domicella

The subspecies C. m. domicella was formerly treated as a separate species, the West African swallow, while the subspecies C. m. melanocrissus, C. m. kumboensis and C. m. emini were formerly placed in the red-rumped swallow C. daurica complex. The taxa were re-arranged based on differences in morphology and genetics. As part of the rearrangement, the red-rumped swallow complex was additionally split into the European red-rumped swallow and the eastern red-rumped swallow.
