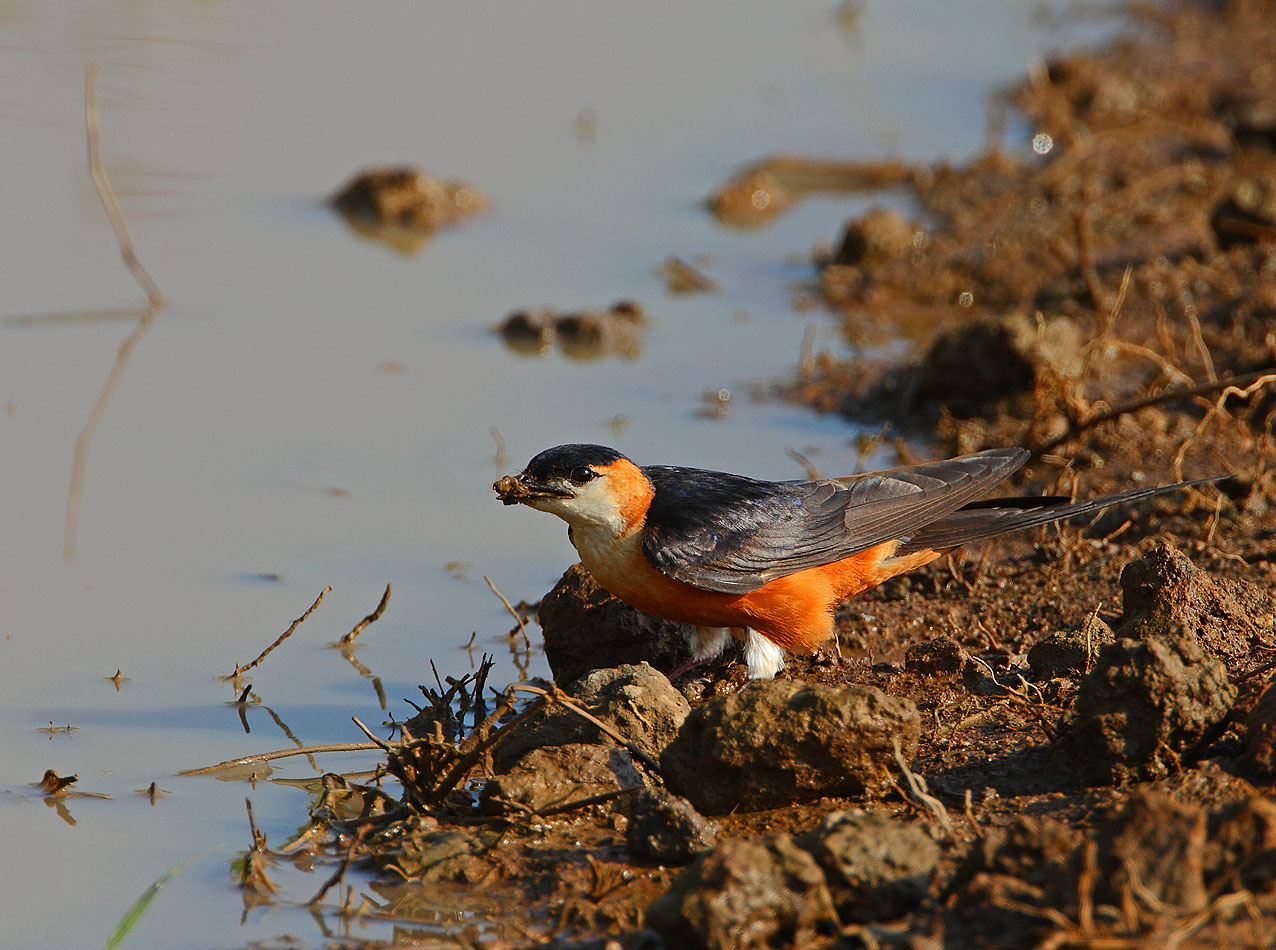

Conservation status
- Least Concern (IUCN 3.1)

Scientific classification
- Kingdom: Animalia
- Phylum: Chordata
- Class: Aves
- Order: Passeriformes
- Family: Hirundinidae
- Genus: Cecropis
- Species: C. senegalensis

Binomial name
- Cecropis senegalensis (Linnaeus, 1766)

Synonyms
- Hirundo senegalensis Linnaeus, 1766

= Mosque swallow =

Species of bird

The mosque swallow (Cecropis senegalensis) is a large species of swallow. It is a resident breeder in much of sub-Saharan Africa, although most common in the west. It does not migrate but follows the rains to some extent.

== Taxonomy ==
In 1760, the French zoologist Mathurin Jacques Brisson included a description of the mosque swallow in his Ornithologie based on a specimen collected in Senegal. He used the French name L'hirondelle du Sénégal and the Latin Hirundo Senegalensis. Although Brisson coined Latin names, these do not conform to the binomial system and are not recognised by the International Commission on Zoological Nomenclature. In 1766, when Carl Linnaeus updated his Systema Naturae for the twelfth edition, he added 240 species that had been previously described by Brisson. One of these was the mosque swallow. Linnaeus included a brief description and used Brisson's Latin name for his binomial name Hirundo senegalensis.

Formerly placed in the genus Hirundo the mosque swallow and its relatives have been shown by molecular studies to be a separate clade and are now placed in the genus Cecropis, which was introduced by the German zoologist Friedrich Boie in 1826.

There are three recognised subspecies:

- C.s. senegalensis (Linnaeus, 1766) – south Mauritania, Senegal and Gambia east to southwest Sudan
- C. s. saturatior (Bannerman, 1923) – west Africa from south Ghana east to Ethiopia and north Kenya
- C. s. monteiri (Hartlaub, 1862) – Angola and south Democratic Republic of the Congo to south Kenya and south to northeast South Africa

== Description ==
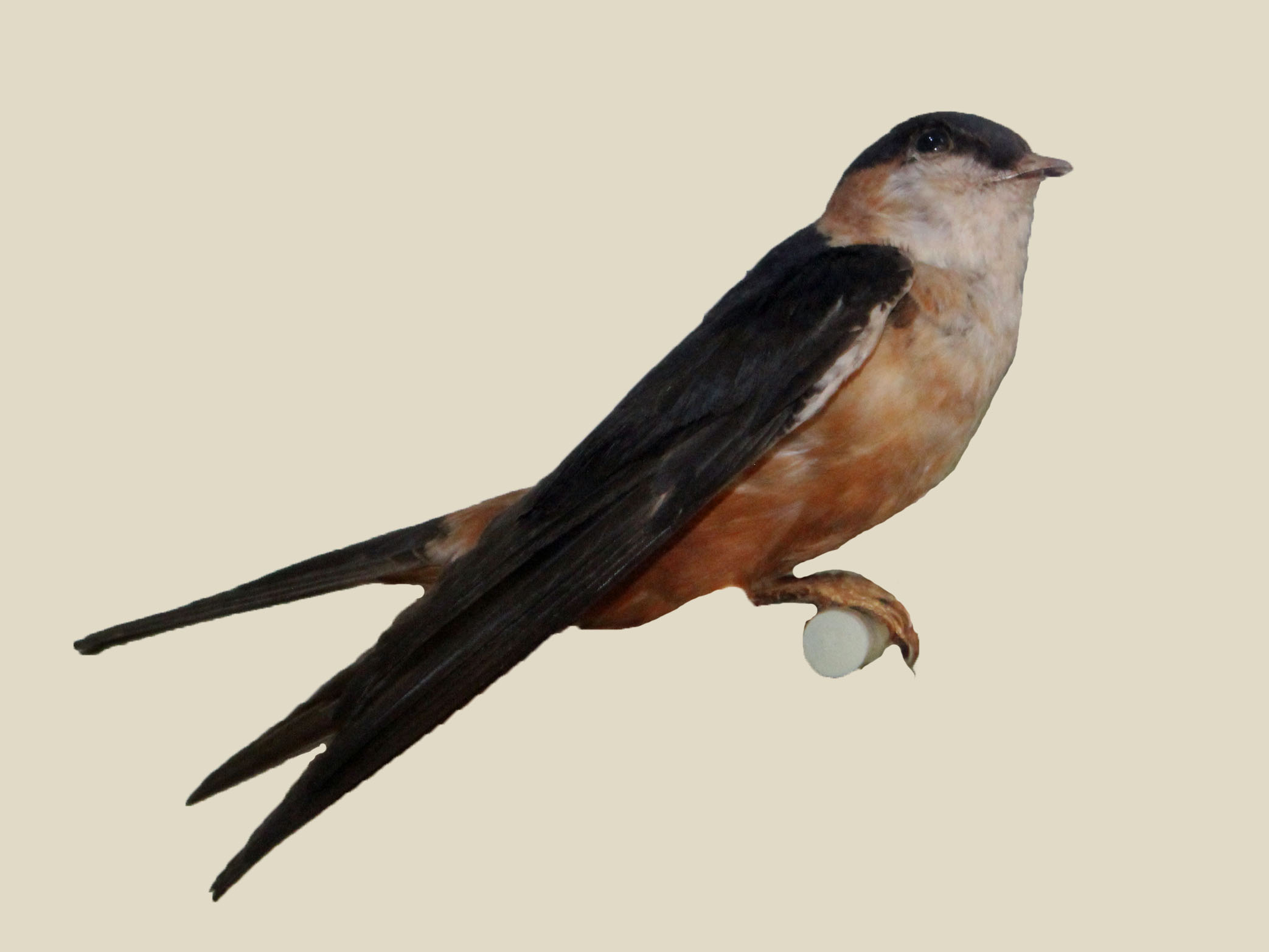
Specimen at Nairobi National Museum

The mosque swallow is the largest and heaviest species of African swallow, resembling a big red-rumped swallow Cecropis daurica. The crown, upperparts, and tail are glossy dark blue, and the lores and sides of the head are whitish forming a collar. The rump is dark rufous, while the throat and upper breast are pale rufous, shading to dark rufous on the remainder of the underparts. Very pale underwing coverts contrast with the dark flight feathers. Females are similar to males but have shorter tail streamers. Juveniles are browner. Mosque swallows are 21–23 cm (8.3–9.1 in) in length.

== Distribution and habitat ==
The mosque swallow is found from southern Mauritania and Senegal east to western South Sudan then south to Namibia, northern Botswana, Zimbabwe, Mozambique, and north-eastern South Africa.

In southern Africa the mosque swallow is a woodland bird, preferring dense broad-leaved woodland with mopane (Colosphermum mopane) but also miombo (Brachystegia spp), with scattered baobabs (Adansonia digitata) and leadwoods (Combretum imberbe). In West Africa it prefers open habitats such as forest clearings and savanna, and also around villages and towns.

== Behaviour and ecology ==
The mosque swallow feeds on flying insects such as ants, termite alates and flies, normally foraging 2–30 m (6 ft 7 in – 98 ft 5 in) above the ground. It is attracted to termite emergence events and bushfires when it can gather in flocks of up to 30 birds, It has a slow rather falcon-like flight with a lot of gliding and often forages high above the woodland canopy in association with other hirundines and swifts.

The mosque swallow nests either solitarily or in small groups. The nest is made of mud pellets and lined with grass and feathers. Its shape is that of a gourd and it has a long entrance tunnel attached to the side. The nest is often situated in a tree cavity, very often in a baobab, but also in or under tree branches, in buildings or road culverts. They breed all year round, with a peak of breeding activity in August–April. The clutch is 2-4 eggs.
