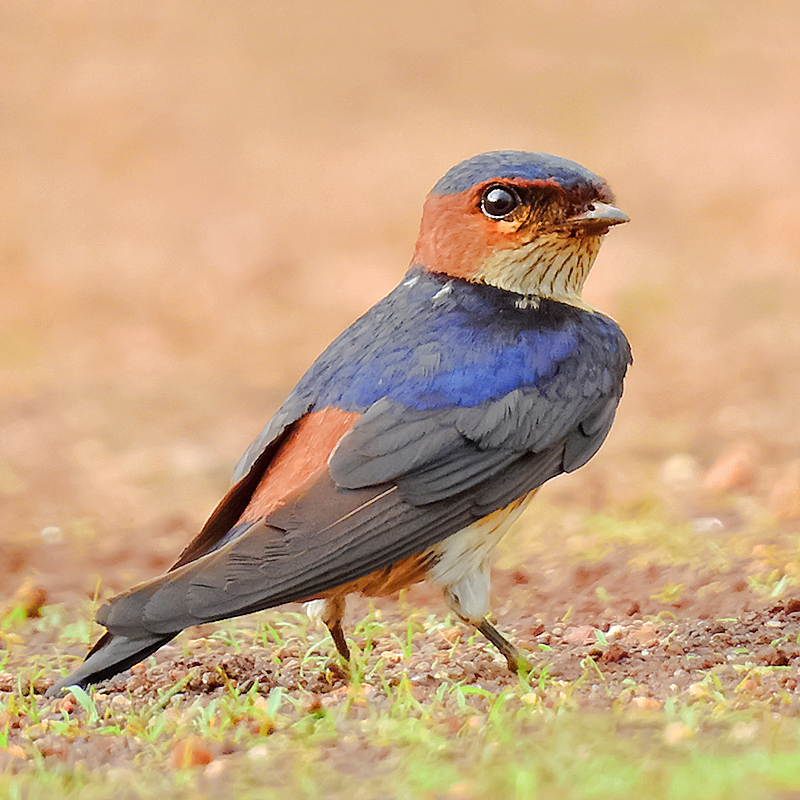
- C. daurica erythropygia at Mangaon, Maharashtra

Conservation status
- Least Concern (IUCN 3.1)

Scientific classification
- Kingdom: Animalia
- Phylum: Chordata
- Class: Aves
- Order: Passeriformes
- Family: Hirundinidae
- Genus: Cecropis
- Species: C. daurica

Binomial name
- Cecropis daurica (Laxmann, 1769)

Synonyms
- Hirundo daurica

= Eastern red-rumped swallow =

Species of bird

The eastern red-rumped swallow (Cecropis daurica) is a small passerine bird in the swallow family Hirundinidae. It is found in open, often hilly, areas with clearings and cultivation across eastern and southeastern Asia to north-eastern India and Taiwan.

The European red-rumped swallow and the African red-rumped swallow were formerly considered as subspecies of the eastern red-rumped swallow.

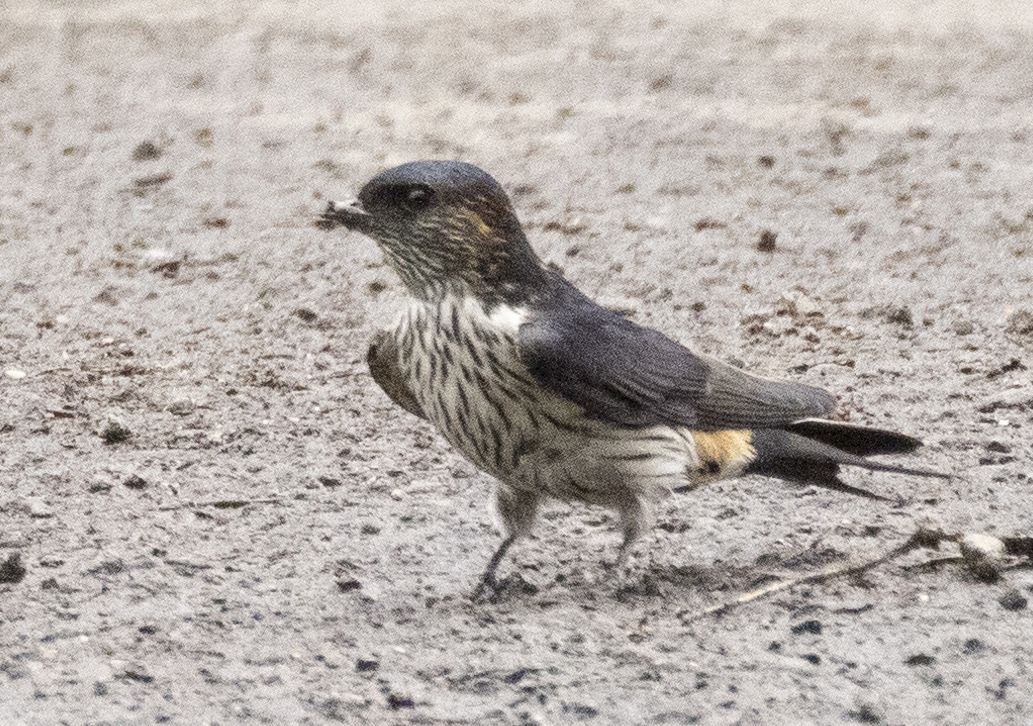
One of the "striated" subspecies in Indonesia

== Taxonomy ==
The eastern red-rumped swallow was formally described in 1769 by the Finnish-Swedish clergyman, explorer and natural scientist Erik Laxmann as Hirundo daurica, using a specimen from Mount Schlangen, near Zmeinogorsk, Russia. It is now placed in the genus Cecropis created by German scientist Friedrich Boie in 1826. Boie's genus name Cecropis is from the Ancient Greek for an Athenian woman. The specific daurica is derived from Dauria, a mountainous region to the east of Lake Baikal in Russia. The alternative genus Hirundo is the Latin word for "swallow". Some authorities consider the West African swallow to be a subspecies of the red-rumped swallow.

Eight subspecies are recognised:

- C. d. daurica (Laxmann, 1769) – northeast Kazakhstan and Mongolia to central south China
- C. d. japonica (Temminck & Schlegel, 1845) – southeast Siberia, Korea Peninsula and Japan to south China
- C. d. nipalensis (Hodgson, 1837) – Himalayas to north Myanmar
- C. d. erythropygia (Sykes, 1832) – central India
- C. d. mayri (Hall, BP, 1953) – northeast Bangladesh, northeast India, north Myanmar and south China
- C. d. stanfordi (Mayr, 1941) – east Myanmar, north Thailand and Indochina
- C. d. vernayi (Kinnear, 1924) – south Myanmar and west Thailand
- C. d. striolata (Schlegel, 1844) – Taiwan and Philippines (except Sulu Archipelago), Java and Bali to Wetar and Timor (east Lesser Sunda Islands)

The subspecies C. d. mayri, C. d. stanfordi, C. d. vernayi and C. d. striolata were formerly treated as a separate species, the striated swallow (Cecropis striolata). The species were lumped together because the variation in strength of the underpart streaking is clinal with no significant difference between C. d. japonica and C. d. mayri.

== Description ==
The eastern red-rumped swallow is 19 cm long with a deeply forked tail. It has blue upperparts other than a reddish collar (sometimes absent) and streaked chestnut rump. The face and underparts are white with heavy dark streaking. The wings are brown. The sexes are alike but juveniles are duller and browner, with a paler rump and shorter outer tail feathers.

The population in mainland India, C. d. erythropygia, has the rump patch uniform dark chestnut without any dark shaft-streaks. The tail fork is shallow and the white patch on the inner web of the outer-tail feathers is indistinct. C. d. japonica breeds in eastern Asia and winters in Thailand, Burma, India and northern Australia. They are heavily streaked on the underside and have faint streaks on the rump. The population along the Himalayas, C. d. nipalensis, migrates to peninsular India in winter and breeds from Kulu in the west to Bhutan and Arunachal Pradesh in the east. This population has the rump paler with dark shaft streaks.

== Behaviour ==
The contact call is pin, the alarm is chi-chi-chi, and the song is a soft twittering.

=== Migration ===
The nominate subspecies C. d. daurica and the northeast Asian C. d. japonica are long-distance migrants, wintering in Indonesia and Malaysia, and even northern Australia in small numbers. The southern and island subspecies are essentially resident, while the continental races C. d. mayri and C. d. stanfordi are partial migrants which move south in the winter.

=== Breeding ===
The eastern red-rumped swallow breeds from April to July alone or semi-colonially with scattered nests. The nest is a retort or bottle-shaped structure, made from mud pellets and lined with dried grasses and feathers. The clutch is usually four, sometimes five, white eggs. Both sexes build the nest, and share incubation and the care of the young.

Nests are constructed in natural caves, but very often in artificial sites on bridges, in culverts and on buildings.

=== Feeding ===
The eastern red-rumped swallow feeds low over the ground or at cliff faces on flying insects. It has a slow buoyant flight compared to the barn swallow. It will feed with other swallow species.

== Gallery ==
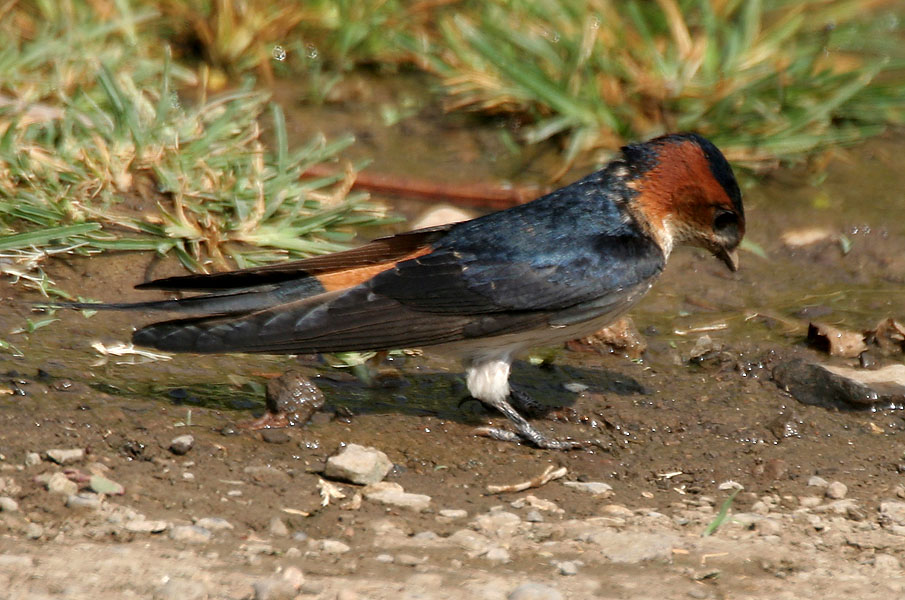
Collecting mud for nest construction (Parli, Maharashtra, India)

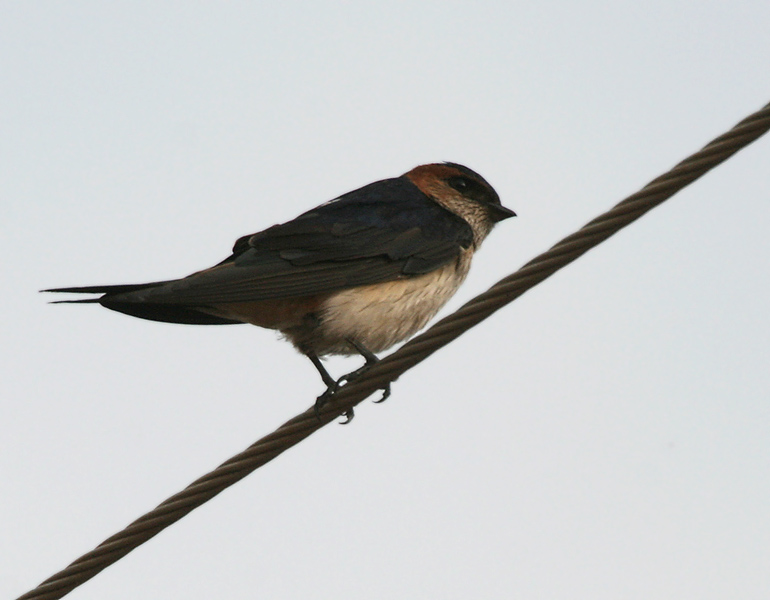
At Ananthagiri Hills, in Rangareddy district of Andhra Pradesh, India.

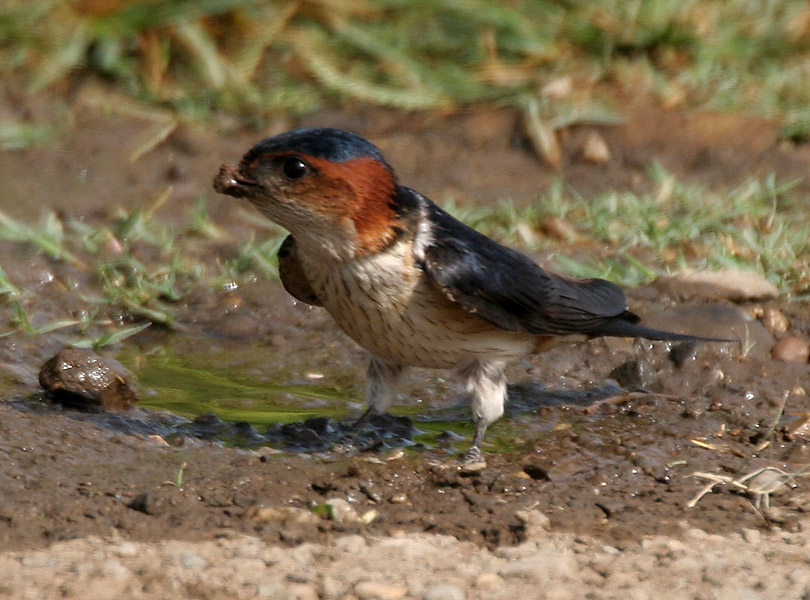
Collecting mud for nest construction (Parli, Maharashtra, India)

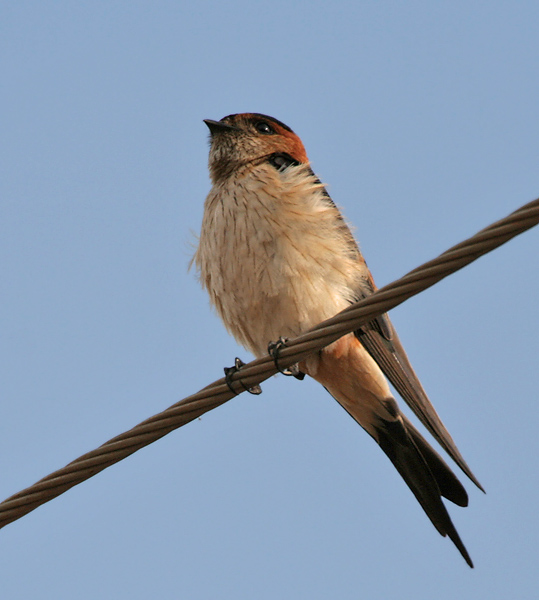
At Ananthagiri Hills, in Rangareddy district of Andhra Pradesh, India.

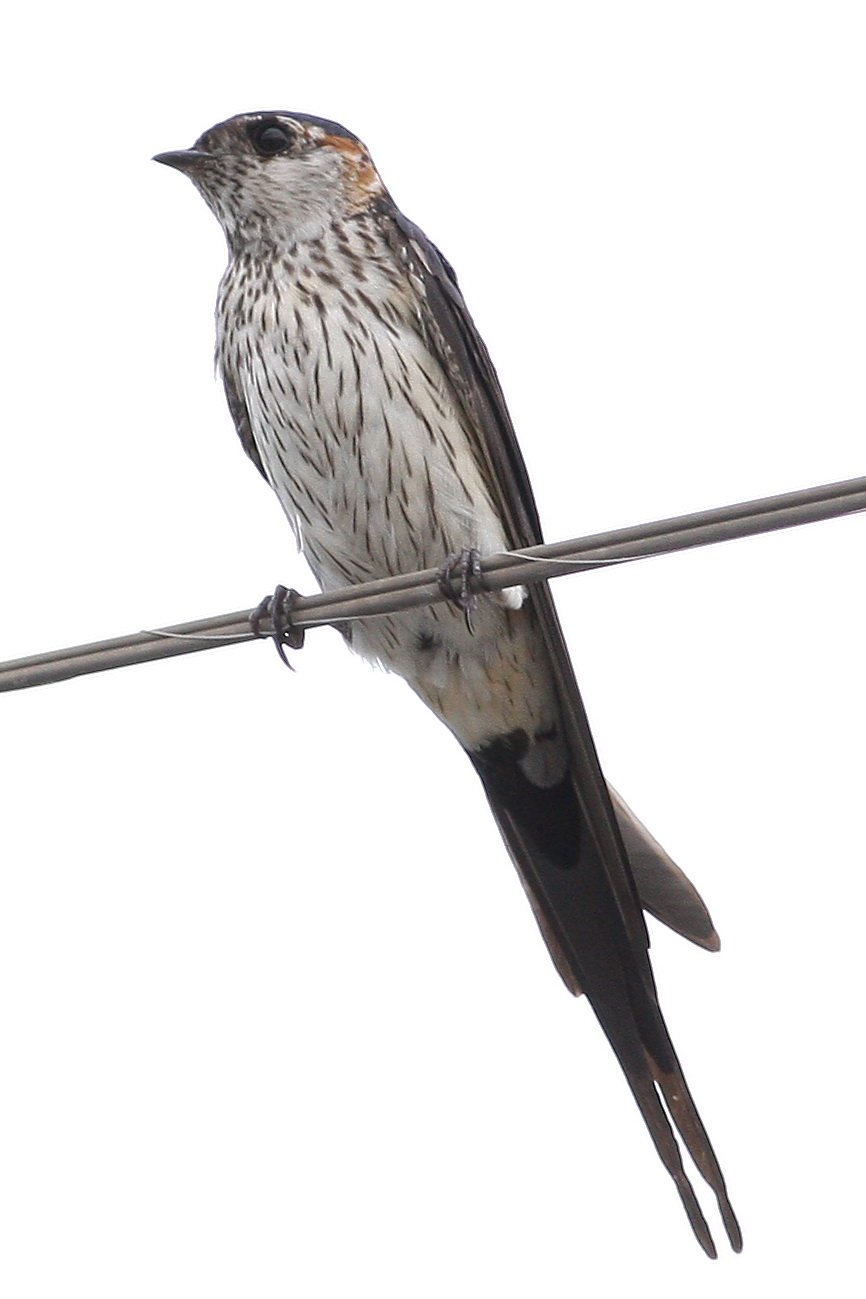
Red-rumped swallow on wire (Hong Kong)

== Sources ==
- Turner, Angela K; Chris Rose (1989). Swallows & Martins: An Identification Guide and Handbook. Houghton Mifflin. ISBN 0-395-51174-7.
