= Karamyshevo, Voronezh Oblast =

Karamyshevo Карамышево
- Settlement
- Location within Voronezh Oblast Location within Russia
- Coordinates: 51°15′N 39°32′E
- Country: Russia
- Region: Voronezh Oblast
- District: Kashirsky District
- Time zone: UTC+3:00

Karamyshevo (Russian: Карамышево) is a rural locality (a settlement) in Dankovskoye Rural Settlement, Kashirsky District, Voronezh Oblast, Russia. The population was 61 as of 2010.

== Geography ==
Karamyshevo is located 23 km south of Kashirskoye (the district's administrative centre) by road. Rozhdestvenno is the nearest rural locality.
