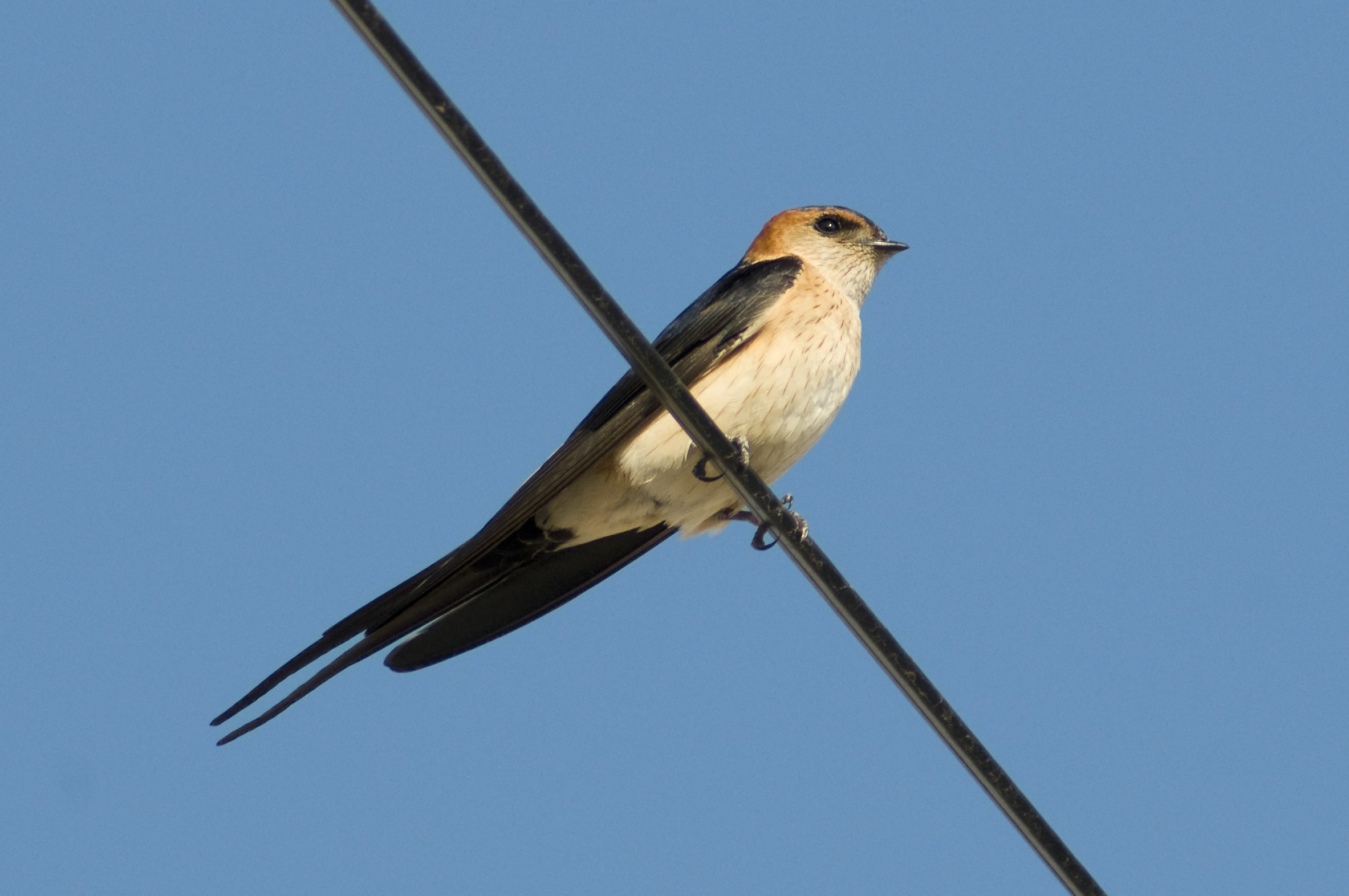
- in Calpe, Spain

Conservation status
- Least Concern (IUCN 3.1)

Scientific classification
- Kingdom: Animalia
- Phylum: Chordata
- Class: Aves
- Order: Passeriformes
- Family: Hirundinidae
- Genus: Cecropis
- Species: C. rufula

Binomial name
- Cecropis rufula (Temminck, 1835)
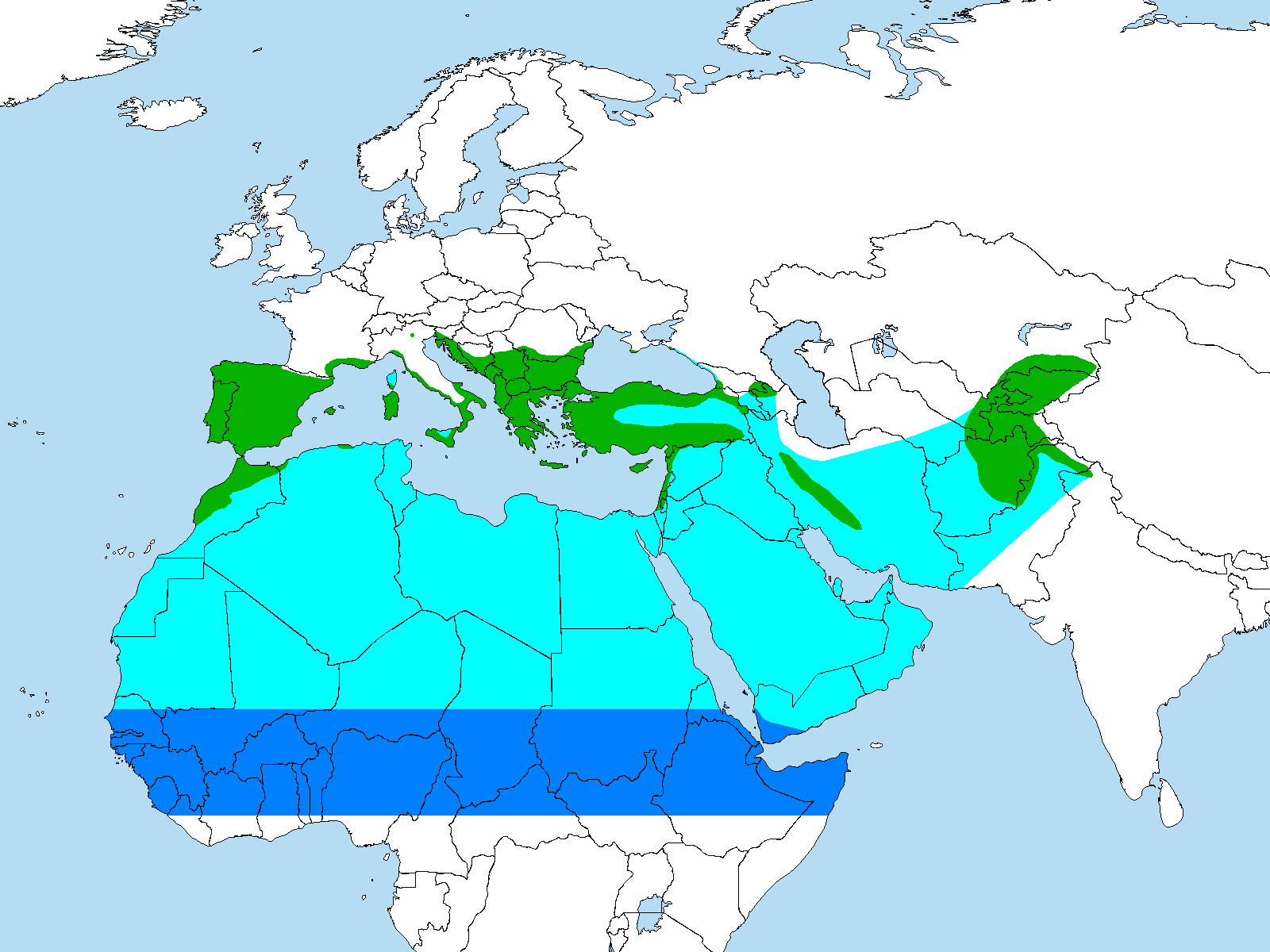
- * Green: breeding summer visitor * Pale blue: passage visitor * Dark blue: winter visitor

Synonyms
- Hirundo rufula; Hirundo daurica rufula; Cecropis daurica rufula

= European red-rumped swallow =

Species of bird

The European red-rumped swallow (Cecropis rufula) is a small passerine bird in the swallow family Hirundinidae. Historically, it was usually treated in a broad concept of the genus Hirundo, but is now treated in the genus Cecropis. It was formerly considered to be a subspecies of the eastern red-rumped swallow (Cecropis daurica), united, together with the African red-rumped swallow (C. melanocrissus, syn. C. domicella), under the common name of red-rumped swallow.

== Description ==
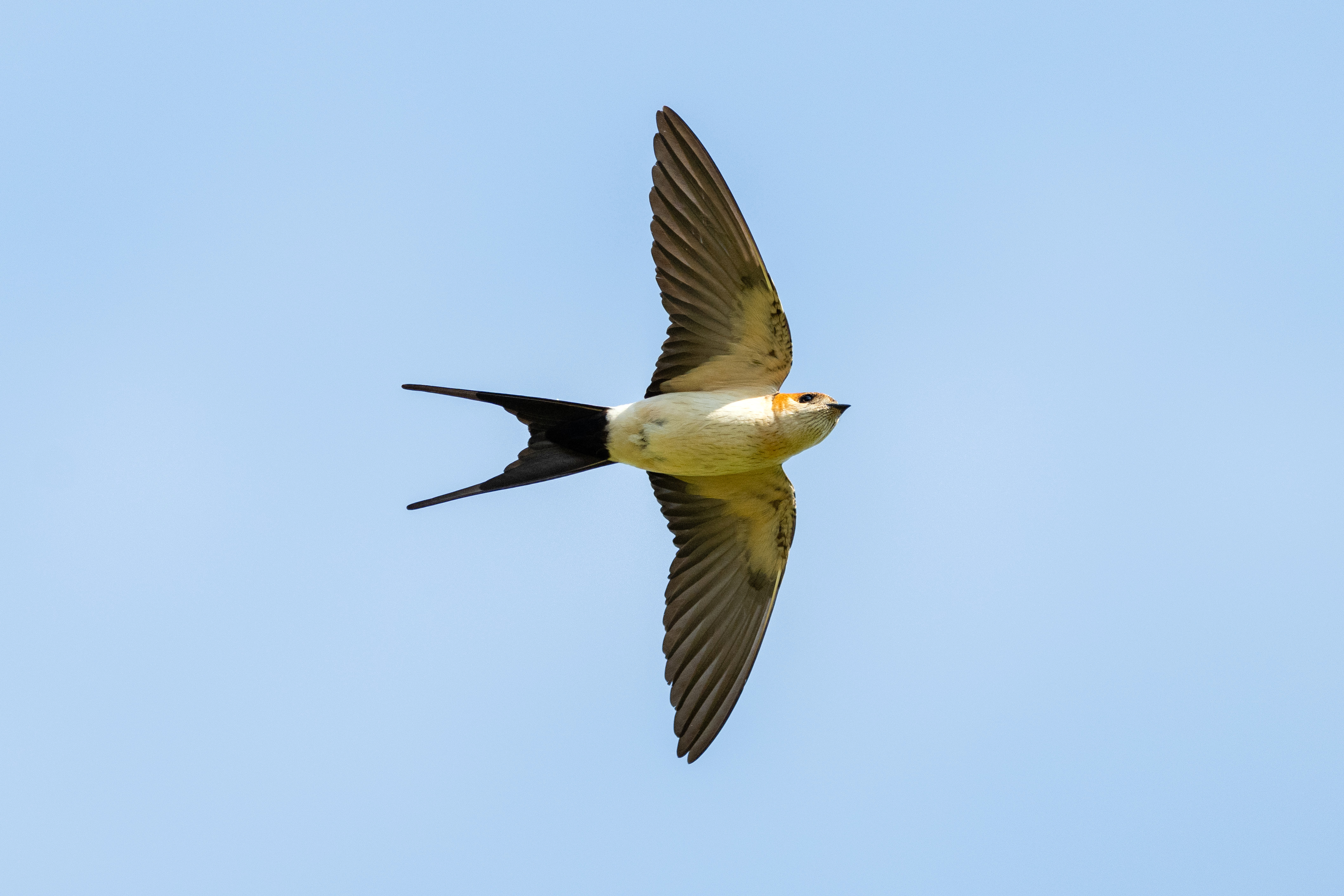
In flight, showing the distinct black 'dipped in ink' tail; Shumen, Bulgaria

European red-rumped swallow is somewhat similar in habits and appearance to the other aerial insectivores, such as the related swallows and the unrelated swifts (order Apodiformes). It has blue-glossed black upperparts and pale buffy underparts. Within Europe, it most closely resembles barn swallow, but is easily distinguished by being buffier below, with pale orangey or reddish rump, a pale buffy face and throat, and an orangey-red nape collar. It lacks the breast band of barn swallow, but has a black undertail, giving the appearance of the whole tail as being 'dipped in ink' and lacking the white tail spots of barn swallow. The tail is deeply forked, much more than western house martin but slightly less than barn swallow. It is a fast flier with long, broad but pointed wings, and swoops on insects while airborne. On its wintering grounds, it can only be distinguished from the African red-rumped swallow by the rump being slightly broader and less strongly rufous orange. Eastern red-rumped swallow is a rare vagrant in Europe; it can be distinguished from its European relative by the streaked underparts, and lack of a clear rufous nape collar.

Juveniles differ from adults in having duller (slightly greyish black, not blue-glossed) upperparts, a paler buffy white rump, and slightly shorter tail streamers, though the tail is still more deeply forked than western house martins.

== Taxonomy ==
The European red-rumped swallow was formally described in 1835 by the Dutch zoologist Coenraad Jacob Temminck under the binomial name Hirundo rufula. The specific epithet is from Latin rufulus meaning "reddish". The species was formerly treated as a subspecies of the red-rumped swallow (Cecropis daurica) now renamed the eastern red-rumped swallow. The species were split based on differences in morphology and genetic divergence. The European red-rumped swallow is monotypic, with no subspecies.

== Distribution and habitat ==
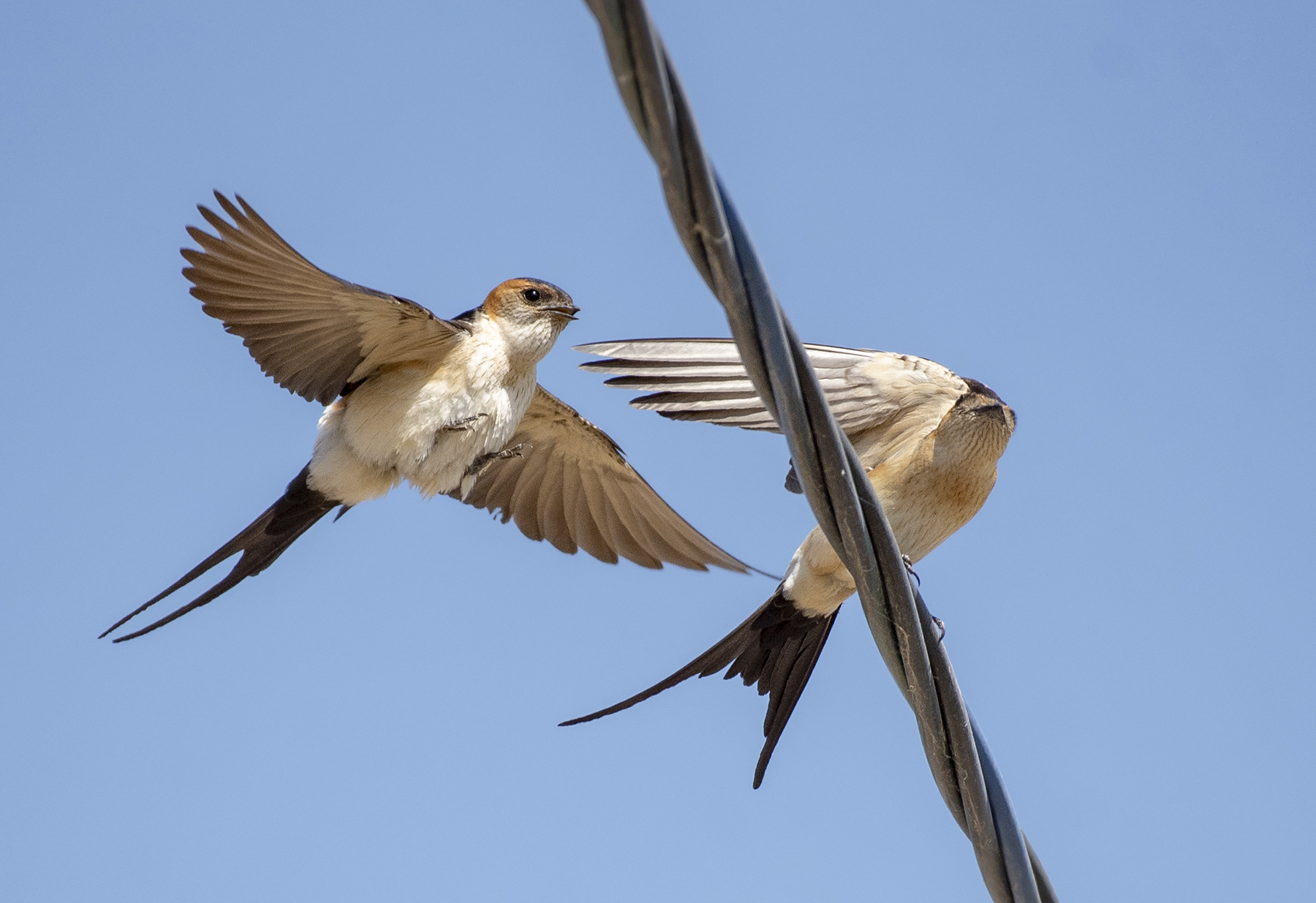
A pair near the eastern end of the species' range in Kazakhstan

It breeds in open country of northwest Africa, southern Europe and southwest and central Asia east to Kazakhstan, northern and western Pakistan and the far northwest of India. During winter it migrates to Africa, mainly in the Sahel and Sudanian savanna regions; its wintering range is not clearly known because of the ease of confusion with the very similar African red-rumped swallow (C. melanocrissus, syn. C. domicella), which is resident in the region. In northern Europe, it is a scarce but regular migrant in small numbers, mainly as a spring overshoot, but also some in autumn.

== Behaviour and ecology ==
These swallows are usually found over hilly and montane grassland, farmland, gardens, villages, and open woodland, where they hawk for insects, often together with other swallows and martins.

=== Breeding ===
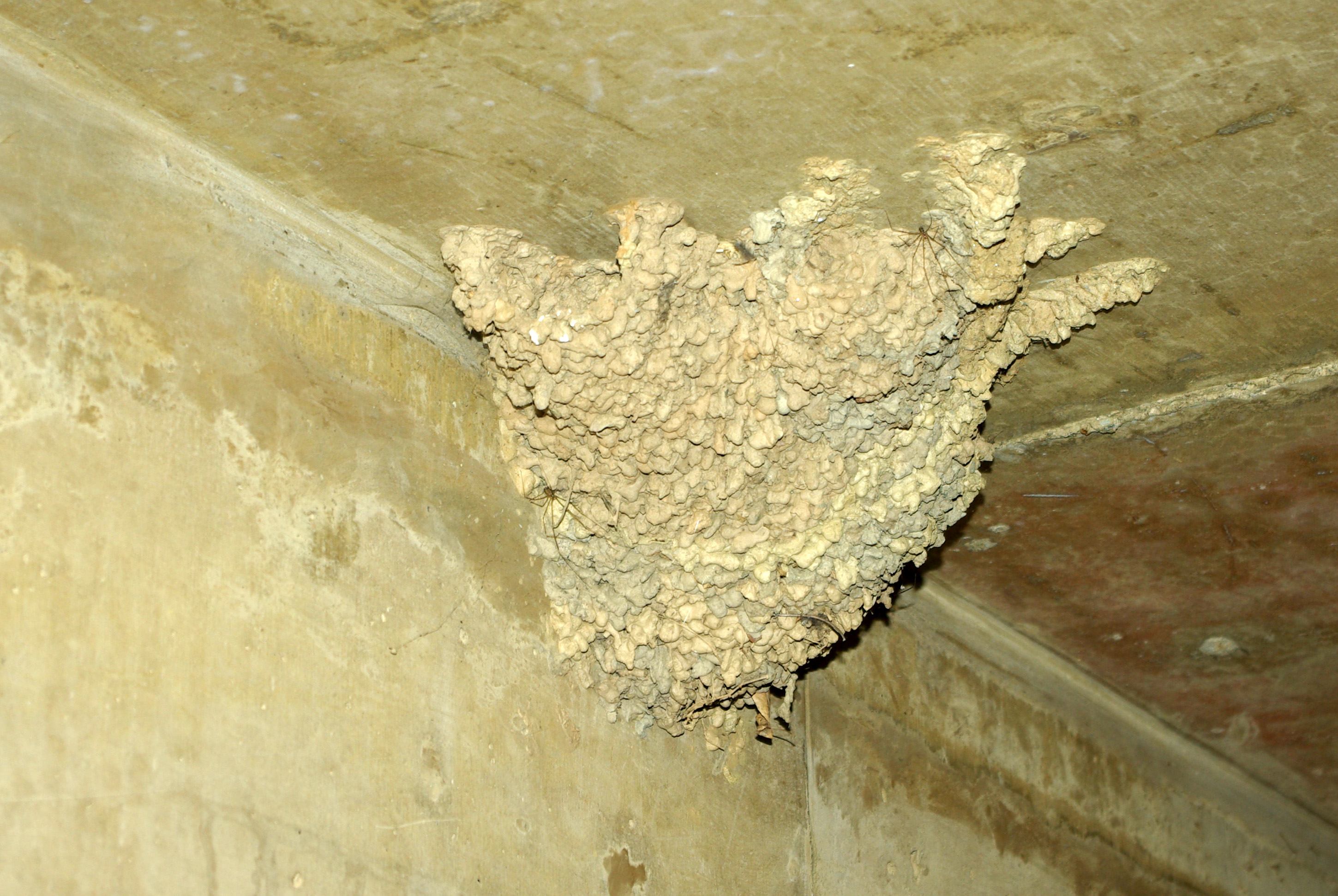
Nest, at Vila Nova de Foz Côa, Portugal

European red-rumped swallows build quarter-sphere nests with a tunnel entrance lined with mud collected in their beaks, and lay 3 to 6 eggs. They nest under cliff overhangs, and have readily adapted to using buildings such as bridges and road underpasses. They do not normally form large breeding colonies, but are gregarious outside the breeding season.

It is thought that the sequence "open-nest" to "closed nest" to "retort nest" represents the evolutionary development in the mud-building swallows, and individual species follow this order of construction. A retort builder like red-rumped swallow starts with an open cup, closes it, and then builds the entrance tunnel. It has been proposed that the development of closed nests reduced competition between males for copulations with the females. Since mating occurs inside the nest, the difficulty of access means other males are excluded. This reduction in competition permits the dense breeding colonies typical of the genera Delichon and Petrochelidon, but colonial breeding is not inevitable; most Cecropis species are solitary nesters.

== Conservation status ==
The International Union for Conservation of Nature (IUCN) is the organisation responsible for assessing the conservation status of species. A species is assessed as subject to varying levels of threat if it has a small, fragmented or declining range, or if the total population is less than 10,000 mature individuals, or numbers have dropped by more than 10% in ten years or with a continuing decline over generations. It is not known to be seriously declining in range or numbers, so it is classed as Least Concern.

The European red-rumped swallow is extending its range northward in Europe in response to global warming, colonising northern Spain, southeastern France, southwestern Slovenia, southern Romania, and Crimea in Ukraine in recent decades. However, it remains oddly scarce and patchy in its occurrence in Italy (and has even become extinct in eastern Italy in Marche and Abruzzo), and has not colonised southwest France, with the Pyrenees mountains being a significant barrier. The European population is estimated at 100,000 to 430,000 breeding pairs or 300,000 to 1,290,000 individuals.

== Sources ==
- Turner, Angela; Rose, Chris (1989). A Handbook to the Swallows and Martins of the World. Christopher Helm. ISBN 0-7470-3202-5.
- Baker, E. C. Stuart (March 1926). The Fauna of British India, Including Ceylon and Burma. Vol. III (Birds) (2nd ed.). London: Taylor and Francis. pp. 248–253.
