= Zmeinogorsk =

Town in Altai Krai, Russia

Zmeinogorsk Змеиногорск
- Town
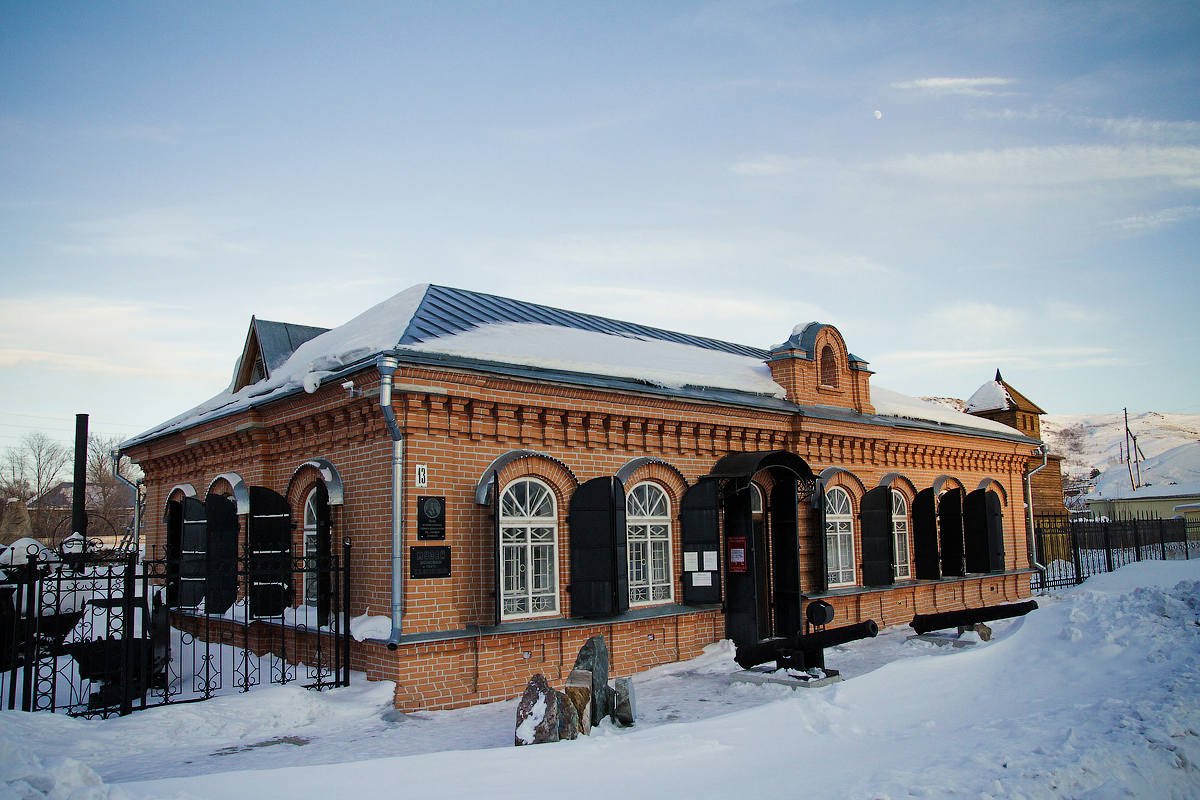

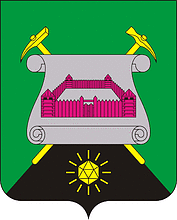
- Coat of arms
- Interactive map of Zmeinogorsk
- Location of Zmeinogorsk Zmeinogorsk (Altai Krai)
- Coordinates: 51°10′N 82°12′E
- Country: Russia
- Federal subject: Altai Krai
- Administrative district: Zmeinogorsky District
- Town of district significanceSelsoviet: Zmeinogorsk
- Founded: 1744
- Town status since: 1952
- Elevation: 450 m (1,480 ft)

Population (2010 Census)
  - Total: 10,955
  - Estimate (2021): 9,410 (−14.1%)

Administrative status
  - Capital of: Zmeinogorsky District, town of district significance of Zmeinogorsk

Municipal status
  - Municipal district: Zmeinogorsky Municipal District
  - Urban settlement: Zmeinogorsk Urban Settlement
  - Capital of: Zmeinogorsky Municipal District, Zmeinogorsk Urban Settlement
- Time zone: UTC+7 (MSK+4)
- Postal code: 658480
- OKTMO ID: 01614101001

Zmeinogorsk (Russian: Змеиного́рск, Town of snake's mountain) is a town and the administrative center of Zmeinogorsky District of Altai Krai, Russia, located on the Korbolikha (the Aley's tributary) and Zmeyevka Rivers. Population: 10,955 (2010 census); 11,625 (2002 census); 12,232 (1989 Soviet census).

== History ==
It was founded in 1736 and granted town status in 1952.

== Geography ==
=== Climate ===
Climate data for Zmeinogorsk
Month	Jan	Feb	Mar	Apr	May	Jun	Jul	Aug	Sep	Oct	Nov	Dec	Year
Record high °C (°F)	8.1 (46.6)	8.4 (47.1)	19.3 (66.7)	30.3 (86.5)	36.5 (97.7)	36.2 (97.2)	39.6 (103.3)	37.1 (98.8)	35.1 (95.2)	27.7 (81.9)	19.7 (67.5)	8.7 (47.7)	39.6 (103.3)
Mean daily maximum °C (°F)	−7.8 (18.0)	−6.1 (21.0)	0.0 (32.0)	11.5 (52.7)	20.7 (69.3)	25.0 (77.0)	26.3 (79.3)	25.0 (77.0)	19.2 (66.6)	10.6 (51.1)	0.2 (32.4)	−5.7 (21.7)	9.9 (49.8)
Daily mean °C (°F)	−13.5 (7.7)	−12.4 (9.7)	−6.0 (21.2)	5.1 (41.2)	13.0 (55.4)	17.8 (64.0)	19.6 (67.3)	17.6 (63.7)	11.8 (53.2)	5.0 (41.0)	−4.5 (23.9)	−10.9 (12.4)	3.6 (38.5)
Mean daily minimum °C (°F)	−19.1 (−2.4)	−18.7 (−1.7)	−12.1 (10.2)	−1.3 (29.7)	5.3 (41.5)	10.5 (50.9)	12.9 (55.2)	10.1 (50.2)	4.4 (39.9)	−0.7 (30.7)	−9.3 (15.3)	−16.0 (3.2)	−2.8 (27.0)
Record low °C (°F)	−47.3 (−53.1)	−42.4 (−44.3)	−36.6 (−33.9)	−24.0 (−11.2)	−8.3 (17.1)	−2.6 (27.3)	2.8 (37.0)	−0.8 (30.6)	−7.4 (18.7)	−22.9 (−9.2)	−44.5 (−48.1)	−45.8 (−50.4)	−47.3 (−53.1)
Average precipitation mm (inches)	43.6 (1.72)	38.1 (1.50)	42.7 (1.68)	48.0 (1.89)	62.9 (2.48)	62.2 (2.45)	87.6 (3.45)	52.3 (2.06)	46.0 (1.81)	67.8 (2.67)	71.6 (2.82)	58.7 (2.31)	681.5 (26.83)
Source: Змеиногорск погода и климат

== Administrative and municipal status ==
Within the framework of administrative divisions, Zmeinogorsk serves as the administrative center of Zmeinogorsky District. As an administrative division, it is, together with the selo of Lazurka, incorporated within Zmeinogorsky District as the town of district significance of Zmeinogorsk. As a municipal division, the town of district significance of Zmeinogorsk is incorporated within Zmeinogorsky Municipal District as Zmeinogorsk Urban Settlement.
