= Zmeinogorsky District =

Zmeinogorsky District Змеиногорский район (Russian)
- District
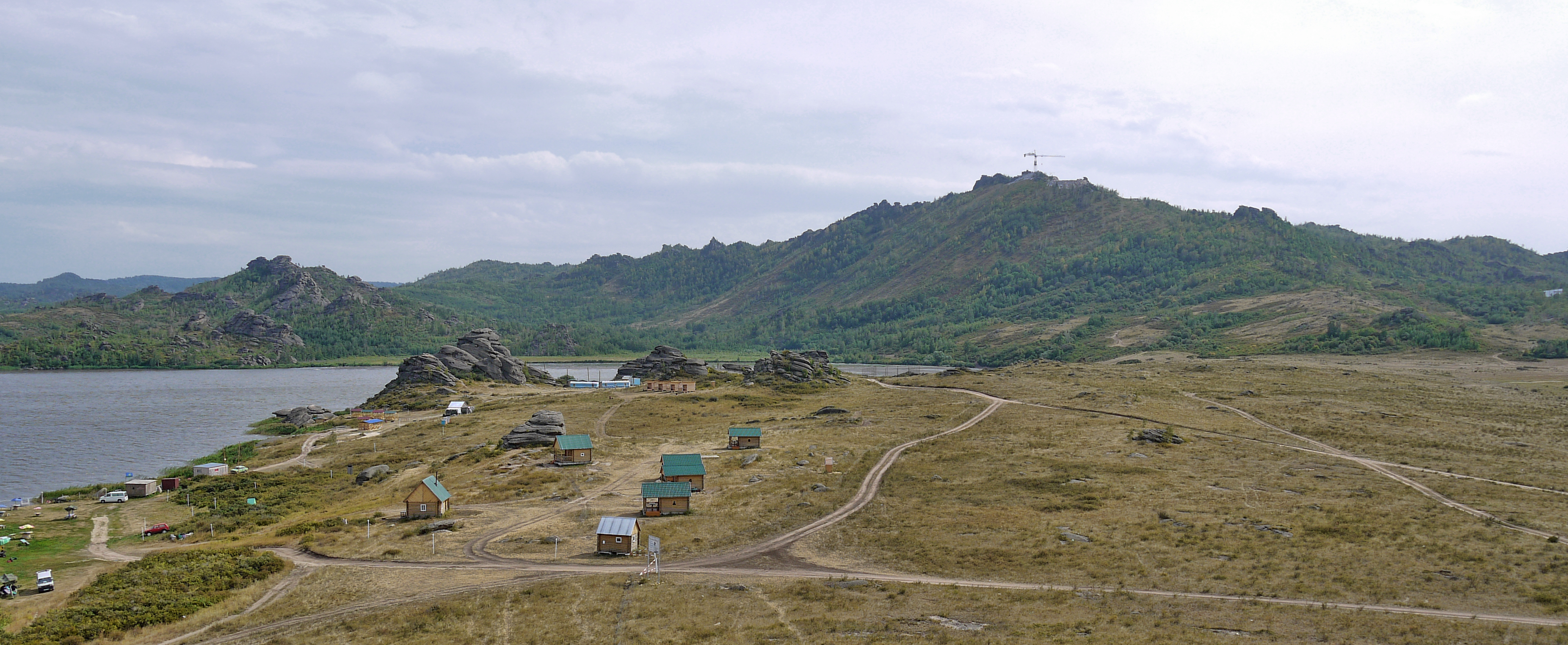
- Kolyvan Mountain, Zmeinogorsky District

- Flag Coat of arms
- Location of Zmeinogorsky District in Altai Krai
- Coordinates: 51°10′00″N 82°10′00″E
- Country: Russia
- Federal subject: Altai Krai
- Established: 1925
- Administrative center: Zmeinogorsk

Area
  - Total: 2,802 km^{2} (1,082 sq mi)

Population (2010 Census)
  - Total: 21,022
  - Density: 7.502/km^{2} (19.43/sq mi)
  - Urban: 52.1%
  - Rural: 47.9%

Administrative structure
  - Administrative divisions: 1 Towns of district significance, 8 Selsoviets
  - Inhabited localities: 1 cities/towns, 24 rural localities

Municipal structure
  - Municipally incorporated as: Zmeinogorsky Municipal District
  - Municipal divisions: 1 urban settlements, 8 rural settlements
- Time zone: UTC+7 (MSK+4)
- OKTMO ID: 01614000
- Website: http://xn----8sbhhjhbicfsohgbg1aeo.xn--p1ai/

Zmeinogorsky District (Russian: Змеиного́рский райо́н) is an administrative and municipal district (raion), one of the fifty-nine in Altai Krai, Russia. It is located in the south of the krai. The area of the district is 2,802 square kilometers (1,082 sq mi). Its administrative center is the town of Zmeinogorsk. Population: 21,022 (2010 census); 12,317 (2002 census); 12,604 (1989 Soviet census). The population of Zmeinogorsk accounts for 52.1% of the district's total population.

== Economy ==
The district is home to the Korbalikhinskoye mine, which has one of the largest reserves of Lead in Russia.
