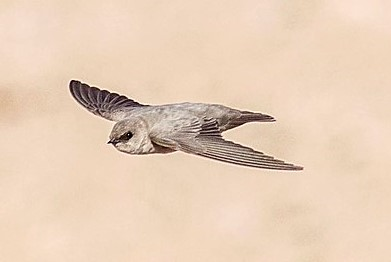
- Pale crag martin flying in the Eastern Desert, Southern Egypt.

Conservation status
- Least Concern (IUCN 3.1)

Scientific classification
- Kingdom: Animalia
- Phylum: Chordata
- Class: Aves
- Order: Passeriformes
- Family: Hirundinidae
- Genus: Ptyonoprogne
- Species: P. obsoleta

Binomial name
- Ptyonoprogne obsoleta (Cabanis, 1851)
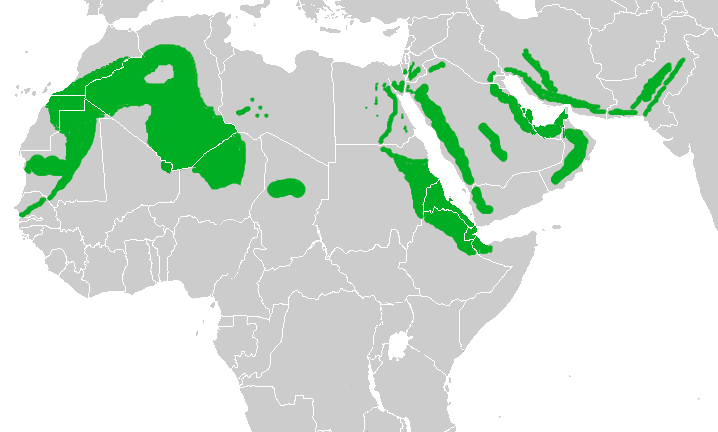
- Approximate range

= Pale crag martin =

Passerine bird in the swallow family

The pale crag martin (Ptyonoprogne obsoleta) is a small passerine bird in the swallow family that is resident in Northern Africa and in Southwestern Asia, east to Pakistan. It breeds mainly in the mountains, but also at lower altitudes, especially in rocky areas and around towns. Unlike most swallows, it is often found far from water. It is 12–13 cm (4 1/2–5 in) long, with mainly brown plumage, paler-toned on the upper breast and underwing coverts, and with white "windows" on the spread tail in flight. The sexes are similar in appearance, but juveniles have pale fringes to the upperparts and flight feathers. It was formerly considered to be the northern subspecies of the rock martin of southern Africa, although it is smaller, paler, and whiter-throated than said species. The pale crag martin hunts along cliff faces for flying insects using a slow flight with much gliding. Its call is a soft twitter.

This martin builds a deep bowl nest on a sheltered horizontal surface, or a neat quarter-sphere against a vertical rock face or wall. The nest is constructed with mud pellets and lined with grass or feathers, and may be built on natural sites under cliff overhangs or on man-made structures such as buildings and bridges. It is often reused for subsequent broods or in later years. This species is often a solitary breeder, but small groups may breed close together in suitable locations. The two or three eggs of a typical clutch are white with brown and grey blotches, and are incubated by both adults for 16–19 days prior to hatching. Both parents then feed the chicks. Fledging takes another 22–24 days, although the young birds will return to the nest to roost for a few days after their first flight.

The pale crag martin is caught in flight by several fast, agile falcon species, such as hobbies, and it sometimes carries parasites, but it faces no major threats. Because of its range of nearly 20 million square kilometres (7,700,000 sq mi) and a large and apparently increasing population, it is not seen as vulnerable and is assessed as Least Concern on the IUCN Red List.

== Taxonomy ==
The pale crag martin was first formally described in 1851 by German ornithologist Jean Cabanis as Cotyle obsoleta, using a specimen collected from near Cairo, Egypt. It was moved to the new genus Ptyonoprogne, created by German ornithologist Heinrich Gustav Reichenbach, in the same year. The genus name is derived from the Ancient Greek ptuon (πτύον), "a fan", referring to the shape of the opened tail, and Procne (Πρόκνη), a mythological girl who was turned into a swallow. The specific name obsoleta means "worn" in Latin.

The Ptyonoprogne species are members of the swallow family of birds, and are classed as members of the Hirundininae subfamily, which comprises all swallows and martins except the very distinctive river martins. DNA sequence studies suggest that there are three major groupings within the Hirundininae, broadly correlating with the type of nest built. These groups are the "core martins", including burrowing species like the sand martin; the "nest-adopters", which are birds like the tree swallow that utilise natural cavities; and the "mud nest builders". The Ptyonoprogne species construct open mud nests and therefore belong to the last group. Hirundo species also build open nests, Delichon house martins have a closed nest, and the Cecropis and Petrochelidon swallows have retort-like closed nests with an entrance tunnel.

The genus Ptyonoprogne is closely related to the larger swallow genus Hirundo, and is sometimes included within it since the nests of the Ptyonoprogne crag martins resemble those of typical Hirundo species like the barn swallow. However, a DNA analysis showed that if Hirundo is enlarged to contain the crag martins, it should include all the mud-builder genera. Conversely, if the Delichon house martins are considered to be a separate genus, as is normally the case, Cecropis, Petrochelidon and Ptyonoprogne should also be split off. The pale crag martin's nearest relatives are the other members of the genus, the dusky crag martin P. concolor of southern Asia, the rock martin P. fuligula of Southern Africa, and the Eurasian crag martin P. rupestris.

The pale crag martin was formerly often treated as the small, pale northern subspecies of the rock martin, but it is now usually considered to be a separate species. The changes in size and colour are continuous, so the evidence for separate species is not strong, although some rock martins can weigh more than twice as much as the smallest subspecies of the pale crag martin. The average weight for P. f. fusciventris is 22.4 grams (346 grains) against 10 g (150 gr) for P. o. obsoleta. There do not appear to be any intermediate forms where pale crag martins and rock martin populations breed close to each other in Somalia and Ethiopia.

In areas of Pakistan where its range overlaps with that of the dusky crag martin, the pale crag martin breeds at a higher altitude. Its range does not overlap there with the Eurasian crag martin, which is found high in the Himalayas, but where both occur in Iran, the pale crag martin favours more arid habitats. In North Africa, the Eurasian species is again found at a higher level. The separation by altitude and aridity means that it is not known whether the closely related Ptyonoprogne martins could hybridise. If they were shown to do so, it would cast doubts on their specific distinctness.

=== Subspecies ===
There are several subspecies differing in plumage shade or size, although the differences are clinal, and races interbreed where their ranges meet.

Subspecies (Note: The table is based on Turner (1989). Parentheses indicate that the scientific name has changed from that originally given.)
Subspecies	Authority	Range	Comments
P. o. obsoleta	(Cabanis, 1851)	Egypt east to southwestern Iran.	The nominate subspecies.
P. o. spatzi	(Geyr von Schweppenburg, 1916)	South central Algeria, southern Libya, Chad and Mali.	Dusky brown plumage with a buff throat, breast and belly.
P. o. presaharica	(Vaurie, 1953)	Morocco, northern Algeria, Mauritania.	Paler and sandier plumage than P. o. spatzi.
P. o. buchanani	(Hartert, 1921)	Aïr Mountains of Niger.	A dark form, intermediate in tone between the nominate subspecies and the rock martin.
P. o. arabica	(Reichenow, 1905)	Southwest Arabia, eastern Sudan, northern Somalia and Socotra.	Like P. o. buchanani but larger.
P. o. perpallida	(Vaurie, 1951)	Northeast Arabia, southern Iraq.	Whitish grey upperparts, white chin and upper breast.
P. o. peroplasta	Hume, 1872	Central Iran east to Pakistan.	Sandier plumage tone than P. o. obsoleta.

== Description ==
Preening while perched on a post

The pale crag martin of the nominate subspecies P. o. obsoleta is 12–13 centimetres (4 1/2–5 inches) long with light brown upperparts, becoming paler on the lower back, and a short square tail that has small white patches near the tips of all but the central and outermost pairs of feathers. It has a pale grey throat, upper breast and underwing coverts, and the rest of the underparts are a dirty white. The eyes are brown, the small bill is mainly black, and the legs are brownish-pink. The wing length averages 13 cm (5 in) and the tail averages 4.8 cm (1 7/8 in). The sexes are similar in appearance, but juveniles have pale edges to the upperparts and flight feathers. The other subspecies differ from the nominate form as detailed in the table above.

This martin moults early, with adults having completely replaced their feathers by late August. Juveniles moult somewhat later, and their old primary feathers are retained even when the body has mainly adult plumage.

The pale crag martin's flight is slow, with rapid wing beats interspersed with flat-winged glides, and it is more acrobatic than the larger Eurasian crag martin. It is a quiet bird; the song is a muffled twitter, and other calls include a trrt resembling the call of the common house martin, a nasal vick, and a high-pitched twee contact call.

The pale crag martin is much drabber than most African swallows, and confusion is unlikely except with other crag martins or with sand martins of the genus Riparia. It is 15% smaller, paler and greyer than the Eurasian crag martin, and has smaller tail spots. It is smaller, paler, and has a more contrasting throat than the rock martin. In the far east of its range, the pale crag martin always has lighter underparts than the dusky crag martin. Although only slightly larger than the sand martin and brown-throated sand martin, the pale crag martin is more robust, has white tail spots, and lacks a breast band. Separation of similar species in flight may be complicated by the difficulty of judging colours accurately in strong desert light, particularly with juveniles. The fast flight of the brown-throated sand martin also makes identification more difficult.

== Distribution and habitat ==
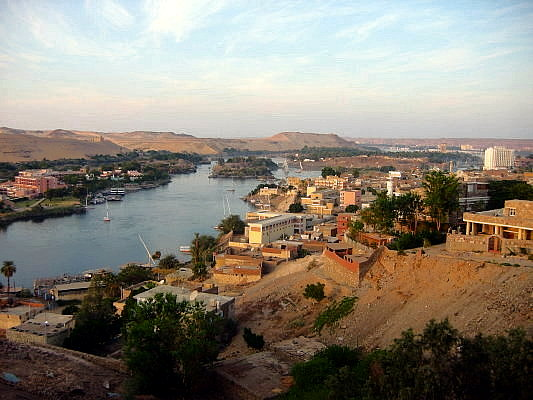
Desert towns like Aswan in Egypt provide man-made nest sites.

The pale crag martin breeds in suitable habitats throughout northern Africa and through the Middle East as far as Afghanistan and Pakistan. It is largely resident apart from local movements or a descent to lower altitudes after breeding. In addition, there is some short-range movement, including martins from southern Arabia crossing the Red Sea and wintering alongside the local breeding birds in Ethiopia and the Horn of Africa, and non-breeding P. f. spatzi and P. f. presaharica joining rock martins in Mali and Mauritania. In Pakistan, the breeding range of the subspecies P. f. peloplasta overlaps with that of the dusky crag martin, although that species breeds at much lower levels, and in North Africa P. f. obsoleta occupies desert habitats whilst the Eurasian crag martin is found in the mountains. The pale crag martin has been recorded as a vagrant in Bahrain, Qatar, Kuwait, and Sri Lanka, although its occurrence in the last country is treated as unproven in a 2011 field guide. The martin has been claimed to visit Turkey, but this is also disputed.

The natural breeding habitat is hilly or mountainous country with cliffs, gorges and caves up to 3,700 m (12,100 ft) above sea level, but this martin also breeds in lowlands, especially if rocks or buildings are available, and may be found far from water. This species readily uses man-made structures as a substitute for natural precipices, and has bred on houses in southern Israel since the 1970s. In Egypt it may breed near monuments like Abu Simbel or in desert towns such as Aswan. It uses towns, bridges and cliffs in Ethiopia, and tower blocks in Arabia. In the breeding season, the martin needs mud or wet soil to construct its nests, and this is normally readily found near human habitations. This species appears to be scarce in some forested and coastal areas with high humidity, in which the red-rumped swallow tends to be the common hirundine.

== Behaviour ==
=== Breeding ===
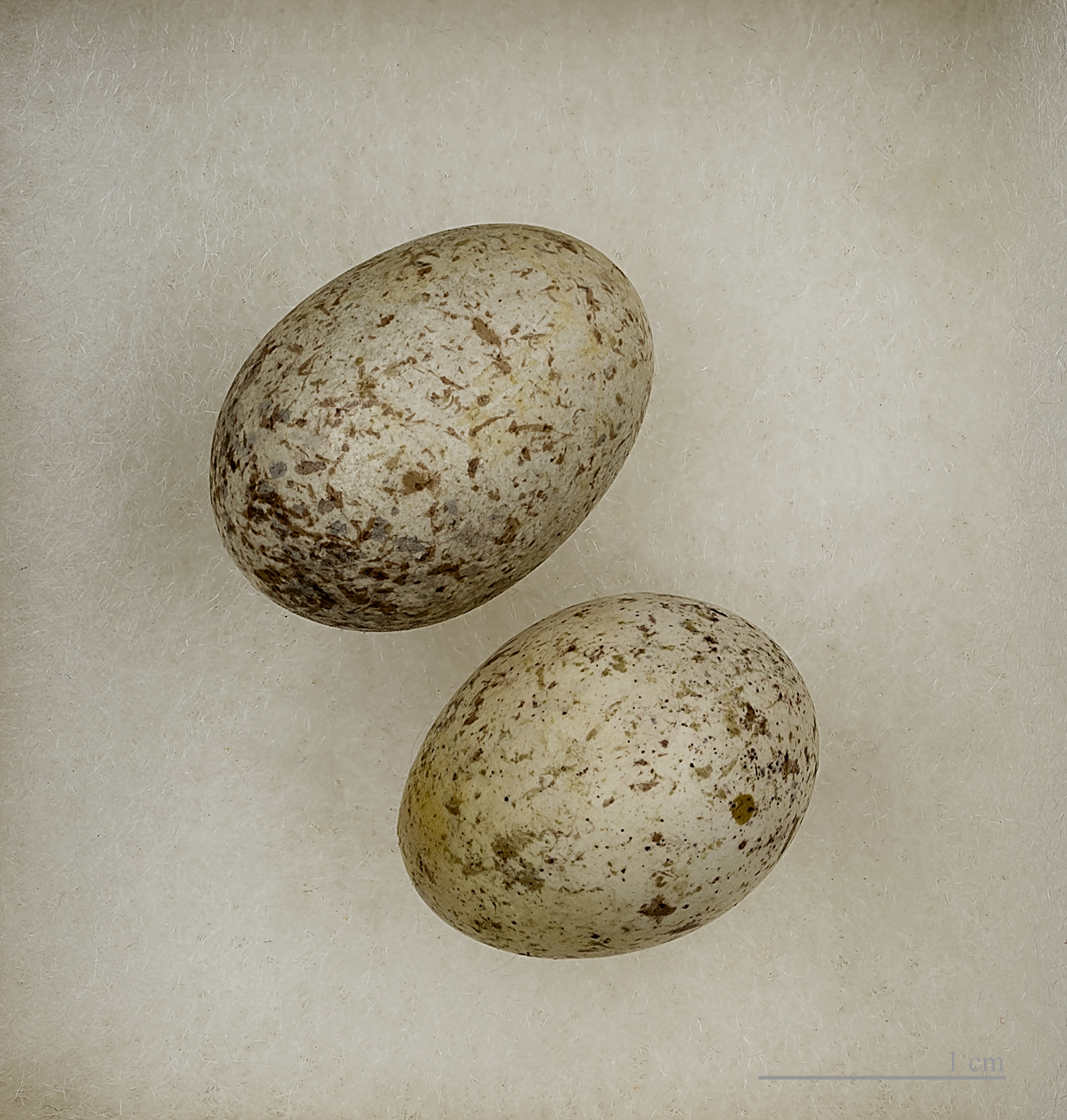
Eggs

Pale crag martin pairs often nest alone, especially in the Sahara, although where suitable sites are available small loose colonies may form. This martin aggressively defends its nesting territory against conspecifics and other species. In Africa breeding dates vary geographically and with local weather conditions, but in northwest Africa February to April is normal, and in Asia nesting is from April to June. Two broods are common, and three have been raised in a season.

The nest, built by both adults over several weeks, is made from several hundred mud pellets and lined with feathers and soft, dry grass, hair, sheep's wool or plant down. It may be a half-cup when constructed under an overhang on a vertical wall or cliff, or shaped as a bowl like that of the barn swallow when placed on a sheltered ledge. The nest may be built on a rock cliff face, in a crevice or on a man-made structure, and is re-used for the second brood and in subsequent years. Caves are found in limestone formations and in the lava flows which cover much of western Saudi Arabia, and their ceilings are a favoured location for nesting pale crag martins, red-rumped swallows, and the little swifts which may appropriate the hirundines' nests. In buildings, nests are usually constructed against concrete, which provides adhesion similar to that of rock, but metal walls are sometimes used, and nests may be supported on beams or other horizontal supports. Birds sometimes breed in occupied buildings, and there is a record of a pair nesting in a busy restaurant kitchen. Artificial nests are readily used, and halved coconut shells have been successfully occupied in Abu Dhabi.

The clutch is usually two or three buff-white eggs blotched with sepia or grey-brown, particularly at the wide end. The average egg size for Asian birds was 19.3 mm × 12.9 mm (3/4 in × 1/2 in) with a weight of 1.7 g (26 gr). Both adults incubate the eggs for 16–19 days prior to hatching and feed the chicks about ten times an hour until they fledge and for several days after they can fly. The fledging time can vary from 22–24 days to 25–30 days, though the latter estimates probably take into account fledged young returning to the nest for food. If a nest is destroyed, or the breeding attempt otherwise fails, a replacement clutch may be laid, typically with fewer eggs. Two nests in Arabia were used in spring and again in the autumn, but it is not known if the same pair were involved.

=== Feeding ===
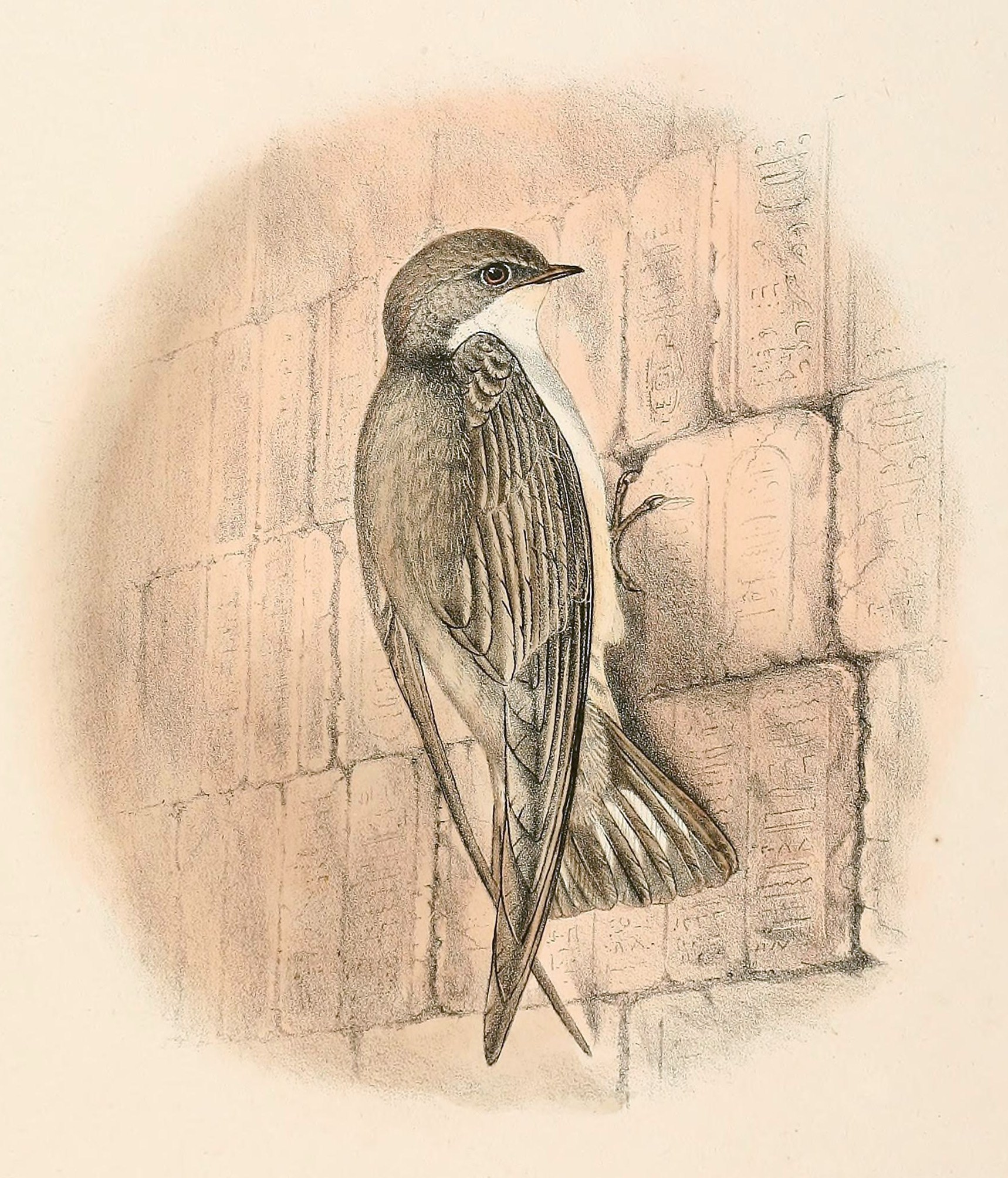
Drawing by Richard Bowdler Sharpe

The pale crag martin feeds mainly on insects caught in flight, but will occasionally feed on the ground. Breeding birds often feed close to their nesting territory, flying back and forth along a rock face catching insects in their bills. Cliff faces generate standing waves in the airflow which concentrate insects near vertical areas. Crag martins exploit the area close to the cliff when they hunt, relying on their high manoeuvrability. When not breeding, they may also hunt low over open ground. The insects caught depend on what is locally available, but may include mosquitoes, flies, Hymenoptera, ants and beetles. This martin often feeds alone, but sizeable groups may gather at grass fires to feast on the fleeing insects, and outside the breeding season flocks of up to 300 may form where food is abundant, such as agricultural areas, wetlands and sewage works. The pale crag martin drinks in flight as it skims the water surface; some of its water requirement is obtained from the insects it consumes. Wintering hirundines of other species are not normally found in the dry, rocky areas in which the pale crag martin nests, so there is little competition for food.

== Predators and parasites ==
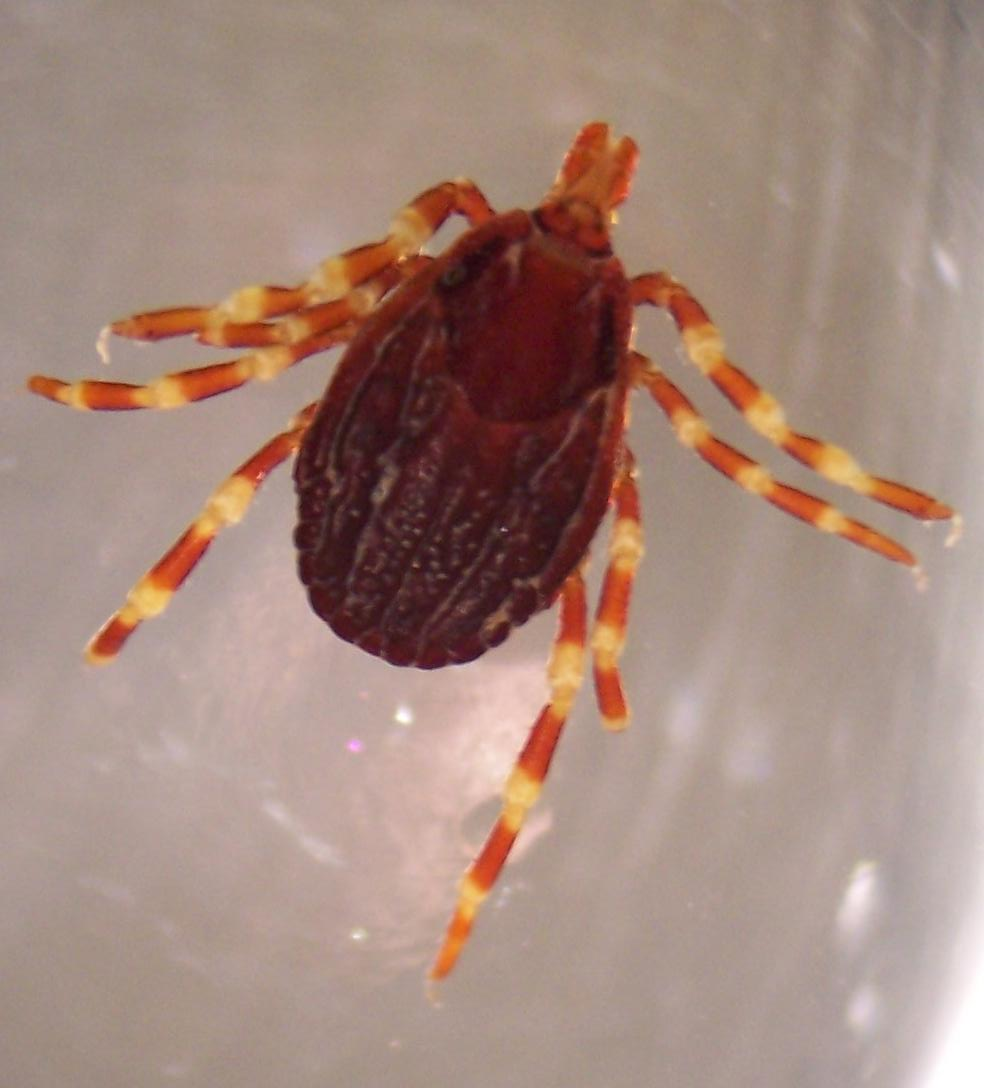
The tick Hyalomma marginatum has been found in pale crag martin nests.

Some falcons have the speed and agility to catch swallows and martins in flight, and pale crag martins may be hunted by species such as the peregrine falcon, Taita falcon, African hobby and wintering Eurasian hobby. Pale crag martins often share their nesting sites with little swifts, which sometimes forcibly take over martins' nests.

The argasid tick Hyalomma marginatum was found in pale crag martin nests on a sarcophagus and an ancient tomb in Egypt. This tick has been implicated in the transmission of Bahig virus, a pathogenic arbovirus previously thought to be transmitted only by mosquitoes. Another argasid tick, Argas africolumbae, was found in a nest of the closely related rock martins in Kenya. The nasal mite Ptilonyssus echinatus was found in a pale crag martin in the Tibesti Mountains of northern Chad.

== Status ==
The pale crag martin has a very large range of 19.8 million square kilometres (7.6 million square miles). The total population is unknown, but the bird is described as very common in Jordan and common in Egypt. It has an expanding range and increasing population. Its large range and presumably high numbers mean that the pale crag martin is not considered to be threatened, and it is classed as Least Concern on the IUCN Red List.

This species is locally common in Algeria, scarce in Morocco, and scarce in Pakistan. It has colonised southern Israel, where it breeds on houses, since the 1970s, and large numbers may occur outside the breeding season in Saudi Arabia and Oman. Population estimates include 10,000 to 100,000 pairs breeding in Egypt, 10,000 pairs in the United Arab Emirates, and an Arabian winter population of up to 150,000 birds in flocks that sometimes contain 300–500 birds. A large breeding range expansion in the Arabian Peninsula has been aided by the use of high-rise buildings as nesting sites, and possibly a greater supply of insects from agricultural land. Breeding is now regular in Abu Dhabi, and Qatar's tall buildings may be the next site for colonisation. The pale crag martin first bred in Iraq in 2009.

== Cited texts ==
- Ash, John (2009). Birds of Ethiopia and Eritrea: An Atlas of Distribution. London: Christopher Helm. ISBN 978-1-4081-0979-3.
- Baker, E C S (1926). Fauna of British India. Birds. Vol. 3 (2 ed.). London: Taylor and Francis. OCLC 312198707.
- Barlow, Clive; Wacher, Tim; Disley, Tony (1997). A field guide to birds of The Gambia and Senegal. Robertsbridge: Pica Press. ISBN 1-873403-32-1.
- Chantler, Phil; Driessens, Gerald (2000). Swifts. Robertsbridge: Pica. ISBN 1-873403-83-6.
- van Duivendijk, Nils (2011). Advanced Bird ID Handbook: The Western Palearctic. London: New Holland. ISBN 978-1-78009-022-1.
- Dunning, John Barnard (1993). CRC handbook of avian body masses. Boca Raton: CRC Press, Inc. ISBN 0-8493-4258-9.
- Harris, Alan; Shirihai, Hadoram; Christie, David (1996). The Macmillan Birder's Guide to European and Middle Eastern Birds. Basingstoke, Hampshire: Macmillan. ISBN 0-333-58940-8.
- Harrison, John; Worfolk, Tim (2011). A Field Guide to the Birds of Sri Lanka. Oxford: Oxford University Press. ISBN 978-0-19-958566-3.
- Jennings, Michael C (2010). Atlas of the Breeding Birds of Arabia. Fauna of Arabia, volume 25. Riyadh and Frankfurt: King Abdulaziz City for Science and Technology, Saudi Wildlife Commission and Senckenburg Forschungsinstitut und Naturmuseum. ISBN 978-3-929907-83-4.
- Mullarney, Killian; Svensson, Lars; Zetterstrom, Dan; Grant, Peter (1999). Collins Bird Guide. London: HarperCollins. ISBN 0-00-219728-6.
- Murray, James A (2005) [1890]. The Avifauna of the Island of Ceylon. New Delhi: Asian Educational Services. ISBN 81-206-1974-9.
- Redman, Nigel; Stevenson, Terry; Fanshawe, John; Small, Brian; Gale, John (2011). Birds of the Horn of Africa: Ethiopia, Eritrea, Djibouti, Somalia and Socotra (Helm Field Guides). London: Christopher Helm. ISBN 978-1-4081-5735-0.
- Reichenbach, Heinrich Gustav (1850). Avium systema naturale (in German). Dresden and Leipzig: F. Hofmeister.
- Sibley, Charles Gald; Monroe, Burt Leavelle (1991). Distribution and Taxonomy of Birds of the World. New Haven, Connecticut: Yale University Press. ISBN 0-300-04969-2.
- Sielicki, Janusz; Mizera, Tadeusz, eds. (2008). Peregrine Falcon Populations – status and perspectives in the 21st Century. Warsaw and Poznań: Turul and University of Life Sciences. ISBN 978-83-920969-6-2.
- Snow, David; Perrins, Christopher M., eds. (1998). The Birds of the Western Palearctic concise edition (2 volumes). Oxford: Oxford University Press. ISBN 0-19-854099-X.
- Turner, Angela K; Rose, Chris (1989). A Handbook to the Swallows and Martins of the World. London: Christopher Helm. ISBN 0-7470-3202-5.
- Welch, Geoff; Demirci, Barbaros; Kirwan, Guy M; Boyla, Kerem; Ozen, Metehan; Castell, Peter; Marlow, Tim; Welch, Hilary (2008). The Birds of Turkey (Helm Field Guides). London: Christopher Helm. ISBN 978-1-4081-0475-0.
