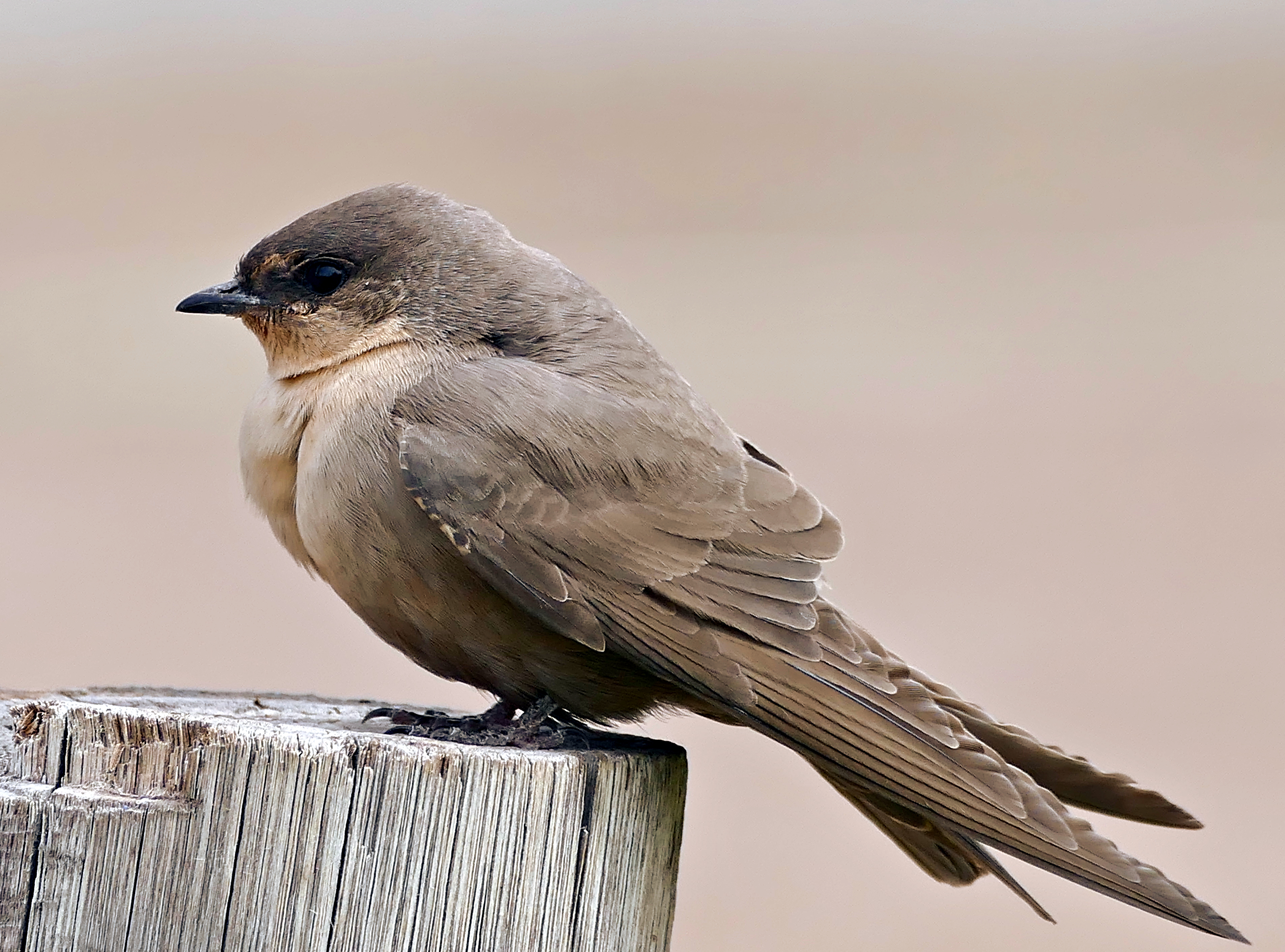
- At the Karoo National Park, Western Cape, South Africa.

Conservation status
- Least Concern (IUCN 3.1)

Scientific classification
- Kingdom: Animalia
- Phylum: Chordata
- Class: Aves
- Order: Passeriformes
- Family: Hirundinidae
- Genus: Ptyonoprogne
- Species: P. fuligula

Binomial name
- Ptyonoprogne fuligula (Lichtenstein, MHC, 1842)
- Range

Synonyms
- Hirundo fuligula Lichtenstein, 1842

= Large rock martin =

Small passerine bird in the swallow family in central and southern Africa

The large rock martin (Ptyonoprogne fuligula), also known as the southern crag-martin, is a small passerine bird in the swallow family that is resident in southern Africa. It was formerly considered to be conspecific with the red-throated rock martin. It breeds mainly in the mountains, but also at lower altitudes, especially in rocky areas and around towns, and, unlike most swallows, it is often found far from water. It is 12–15 cm (4.7–5.9 in) long, with mainly brown plumage, paler-toned on the upper breast and underwing coverts, and with white "windows" on the spread tail in flight. The sexes are similar in appearance, but juveniles have pale fringes to the upperparts and flight feathers. The former northern subspecies are smaller, paler, and whiter-throated than southern African forms, and are now usually split as a separate species, the pale crag martin. The large rock martin hunts along cliff faces for flying insects using a slow flight with much gliding. Its call is a soft twitter.

The large rock martin builds a deep bowl nest on a sheltered horizontal surface, or a neat quarter-sphere against a vertical rock face or wall. The nest is constructed with mud pellets and lined with grass or feathers, and may be built on natural sites under cliff overhangs or on man-made structures such as buildings, dam walls, culverts and bridges. It is often reused for subsequent broods or in later years. The large rock martin is a solitary breeder, and is not gregarious, but small groups may breed close together in suitable locations. The two or three eggs of a typical clutch are white with brown and grey blotches, and are incubated by both adults for 16–19 days prior to hatching. Both parents then feed the chicks. Fledging takes another 22–24 days, but the young birds will return to the nest to roost for a few days after the first flight.

The large rock martin is often predated on by several fast and agile species of falcon, such as the hobby, and it sometimes carries parasites. Because it is common within its large range with an apparently stable population, it is assessed as a least-concern species on the IUCN Red List.

== Taxonomy ==
The large rock martin was formally described in 1842 by German physician, explorer and zoologist Hinrich Lichtenstein under the binomial name Hirundo fuligula. The type locality was subsequently designated as the town of Makhanda in the Eastern Cape province of South Africa. The species is now placed in the genus Ptyonoprogne that was introduced in 1850 by the German ornithologist Heinrich Gustav Reichenbach. The genus name is derived from the Ancient Greek ptuon (πτύον), "a fan", referring to the shape of the opened tail, and Procne (Πρόκνη), a mythological girl who was turned into a swallow. The specific name fuligula means "sooty-throated", from the Latin fuligo, "soot", and gula, "throat". The large rock martin was formerly considered to be conspecific with the red-throated rock martin (Ptyonoprogne rufigula) of central Africa with the English name "rock martin" for the combined taxa. The species were split based on morphological differences and phylogenomic analysis. Other than the red-throated rock martin, its nearest relatives are the three other members of the genus, the pale crag martin (P. obsoleta) of north Africa, the dusky crag martin (P. concolor) of southern Asia and the Eurasian crag martin (P. rupestris).

The five Ptyonoprogne species are members of the swallow family, and are placed in the subfamily Hirundininae, which comprises all swallows and martins except the very distinctive river martins. DNA sequence studies suggest that there are three major groupings within the Hirundininae, broadly correlating with the type of nest built. The groups are the "core martins" including burrowing species like the sand martin, the "nest-adopters", which are birds like the tree swallow that utilise natural cavities, and the "mud nest builders". The Ptyonoprogne species construct open mud nests and therefore belong to the last group. Hirundo species also build open nests, Delichon house martins have a closed nest, and the Cecropis and Petrochelidon swallows have retort-like closed nests with an entrance tunnel.

The genus Ptyonoprogne is closely related to the larger swallow genus, Hirundo, but a DNA analysis published in 2005 showed that a coherent enlarged Hirundo should contain all mud-builder genera. Although the nests of the Ptyonoprogne crag martins resemble those of typical Hirundo species like the barn swallow, the DNA research suggested that if the Delichon house martins are considered to be a separate genus, as is normally the case, Cecropis, Petrochelidon and Ptyonoprogne should also be split off.

=== Subspecies ===
There are several subspecies differing in plumage shade or size, although the differences are clinal, and races interbreed where their ranges meet. The small, pale former subspecies (obsoleta, peroplasta, perpallida, presaharica, spatzi, arabica and buchanani) found in the mountains of North Africa, the Arabian peninsula and southwest Asia are now normally split as a separate species, the pale crag martin, following German ornithologist Jean Cabanis, who first formally described these birds, but the changes in size and colour are continuous, and the forms often intergrade where they meet, so the evidence for separate species is not strong. The large rock martin can weigh more than twice as much as the smallest northern subspecies of pale crag martin. The average weight for P. f. fusciventris is 22.4 g (0.79 oz) against 10 g (0.35 oz) for P. o. obsoleta. The robust, large-billed southernmost forms (P. f. fuligula, P. f. pretoriae, and P. f. anderssoni) are sufficiently different from dark, fine-billed P. f. fusciventris that the latter could also be regarded as a potentially different species. However, Rhodesian ornithologist Michael Irwin collected specimens from southern Zimbabwe (then Rhodesia) which were dark above like P. f. fusciventris and rich reddish below like P. f. fuligula. This led him to suggest that the two groups had previously been isolated, but were probably hybridising following secondary contact.

Subspecies
Subspecies	Authority (Note: Parentheses indicate that the species is no longer placed in its original genus.)	Range	Comments
Ptyonoprogne fuligula fuligula	(Lichtenstein, 1842)	South Namibia and west South Africa	The nominate subspecies
Ptyonoprogne fuligula anderssoni	(Sharpe & Wyatt, 1887)	Southwest Angola, north, central Namibia	Size similar to nominate, but paler plumage
Ptyonoprogne fuligula pretoriae	Roberts, 1922	Southwest Zimbabwe and south Mozambique to east South Africa	Plumage as nominate, but larger

== Description ==
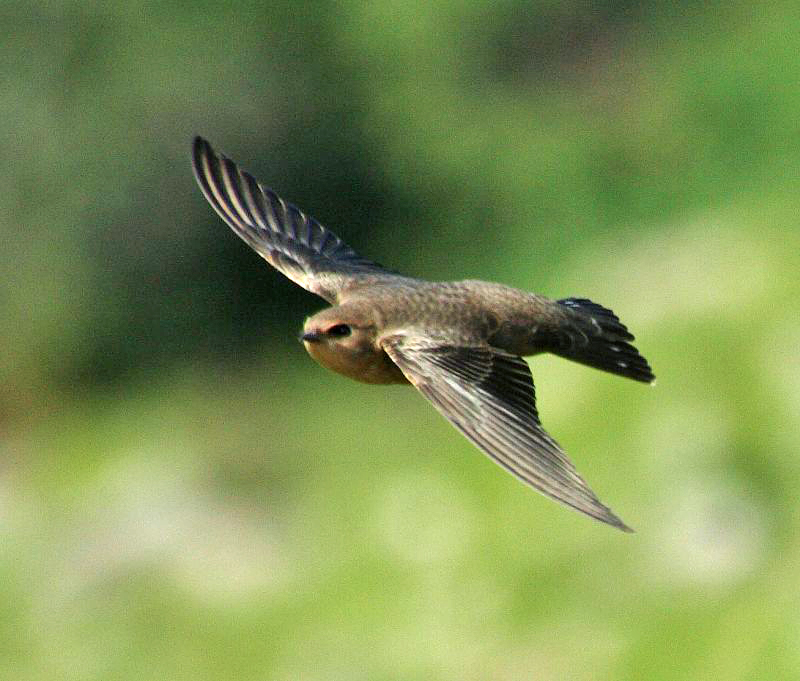
P. f. pretoriae in flight

The large rock martin of the nominate subspecies P. f. fuligula is 12–15 cm (4.7–5.9 in) long, with earth-brown upperparts and a short square tail that has small white patches near the tips of all but the central and outermost pairs of feathers. It has a cinnamon chin, throat, upper breast and underwing coverts, with the rest of the underparts being a similar brown to the upperparts. The eyes are brown, the small bill is mainly black, and the legs are brownish-pink. The sexes are similar in appearance, but juveniles have pale edges to the upperparts and flight feathers. The other subspecies differ from the nominate form as detailed above.

The large rock martin's flight is slow, with rapid wing beats interspersed with flat-winged glides, and it is more acrobatic than the larger Eurasian crag martin. It is a quiet bird; the song is a muffled twitter, and other calls include a 'trrt' resembling the call of the common house martin, a nasal 'vick', and a high-pitched 'twee' contact call.

The large rock martin is much drabber than most African swallows, and confusion is unlikely except with other crag martins or with sand martins of the genus Riparia. The pale crag martin is smaller, paler and greyer than its southern relative. Although only slightly larger than the sand martin and brown-throated sand martin, the large rock martin is more robust, has white tail spots, and lacks a breast band. It is paler on the throat, breast and underwings than the all-dark form of the brown-throated sand martin.

== Distribution and habitat ==
The large rock martin breeds in suitable habitat in much of South Africa and Namibia. It is more patchily distributed in Zimbabwe and is absent from most of Botswana. It is largely resident apart from local movements or a descent to lower altitudes after breeding.

The natural breeding habitat is hilly or mountainous country with cliffs and escarpment ridges, often far from water. When breeding it readily uses man-made structures as a substitute for natural rock faces.

== Behaviour ==
=== Breeding ===
Large rock martin pairs often nest alone, although where suitable sites are available small loose colonies may form with up to 40 pairs. These martins aggressively defend their nesting territory against conspecifics and other species. Breeding dates vary geographically and with local weather conditions. Two broods are common, and three have been raised in a season. Breeding occurs mainly through August and September. The nest, built by both adults over several weeks, is made from several hundred mud pellets and lined with soft dry grass or sometimes feathers. It may be a half-cup when constructed under an overhang on a vertical wall or cliff, or bowl-shaped like that of the barn swallow when placed on a sheltered ledge. The nest may be built on a rock cliff face, in a crevice or on a man-made structure, and is often re-used for the second brood and in subsequent years.

The clutch is usually two or three buff-white eggs blotched with sepia or grey-brown particularly at the wide end. The average egg size in South Africa was 20.8 mm × 14.1 mm (0.82 in × 0.56 in) with a weight of 2.17 g (0.077 oz). Both adults incubate the eggs for 16–19 days prior to hatching and feed the chicks about ten times an hour until they fledge and for several days after they can fly. The fledging time can vary from 22–24 days to 25–30 days, though the latter estimates probably take into account fledged young returning to the nest for food.

=== Feeding ===
The rock martin feeds mainly on insects caught in flight, although it will occasionally feed on the ground. When breeding, birds often fly back and forth along a rock face catching insects in their bills and feed close to the nesting territory. At other times, they may hunt low over open ground. The insects caught depend on what is locally available, but may include mosquitoes and other flies, Hymenoptera, ants and beetles. This martin often feeds alone, but sizeable groups may gather at grass fires to feast on the fleeing insects, and outside the breeding season flocks of up to 300 may form where food is abundant. Cliff faces generate standing waves in the airflow which concentrate insects near vertical areas. Crag martins exploit the area close to the cliff when they hunt, relying on their high manoeuvrability and ability to perform tight turns.

A study of nine bird species including four hirundines showed that the more young there are in a nest, the more frequent are the parents' feeding visits, but the visits do not increase in proportion to the number of young. On average a solitary nestling therefore gets more food than a member of a pair or of a trio. Since the nestling period is not prolonged in proportion to the drop in feeding rate, an individual fledgling from a larger brood is likely to weigh less when it leaves the nest. However, a subspecies of the rock martin (P. f. fusciventris) was an anomaly in respect of both feeding rate and nestling time. There was no difference in parental feeding rate for members of a pair and members of a trio, but the nestling period averaged 1.5 days longer for trios than pairs.

== Predators and parasites ==
Some falcons have the speed and agility to catch swallows and martins in flight, and large rock martins may be hunted by species such as the peregrine falcon, Taita falcon, African hobby and wintering Eurasian hobby. Large rock martins often share their nesting sites with little swifts, which sometimes forcibly take over the martin's nests. In 1975, one of the first findings of the tick Argas (A.) africolumbae was in a nest of Ptyonoprogne f. fusciventris in Kenya, at that time the martin was described under its synonym Ptyonoprogne fuligula rufigula (Fischer & Reichenow).

== Status ==
The large rock martin has a very large range. The total global population is unknown, but the bird is described as generally common, although scarce in Botswana and Namibia. The population is thought to be stable, mainly due to the absence of evidence of any declines or substantial threats. Its large range and presumably high numbers mean that the rock martin is not considered to be threatened, and it is classed as least concern on the IUCN Red List.

== Cited texts ==
- Baker, E C S (1926). Fauna of British India. Birds. Vol. 3 (2nd ed.). London: Taylor and Francis.
- Barlow, Clive; Wacher, Tim; Disley, Tony (1997). A field guide to birds of The Gambia and Senegal. Robertsbridge: Pica Press. ISBN 1-873403-32-1.
- Chantler, Phil; Driessens, Gerald (2000). Swifts. Robertsbridge: Pica Press. ISBN 1-873403-83-6.
- Dunning, John Barnard (1993). CRC handbook of avian body masses. Boca Raton: CRC Press. ISBN 0-8493-4258-9.
- Mullarney, Killian; Svensson, Lars; Zetterström, Dan; Grant, Peter (1999). Collins Bird Guide. London: HarperCollins. ISBN 0-00-219728-6.
- Sielicki, Janusz (2008). Mizera, Tadeusz (ed.). Peregrine Falcon Populations – status and perspectives in the 21st Century. Warsaw and Poznań: Turul and University of Life Sciences. ISBN 978-83-920969-6-2.
- Sinclair, Ian; Hockey, Phil; Tarboton, Warwick (2002). SASOL Birds of Southern Africa. Cape Town: Struik. ISBN 1-86872-721-1.
- Snow, David (1998). Perrins, Christopher M (ed.). The Birds of the Western Palearctic concise edition (2 volumes). Oxford: Oxford University Press. ISBN 0-19-854099-X.
- Turner, Angela K; Rose, Chris (1989). A Handbook to the Swallows and Martins of the World. London: Christopher Helm. ISBN 0-7470-3202-5.
