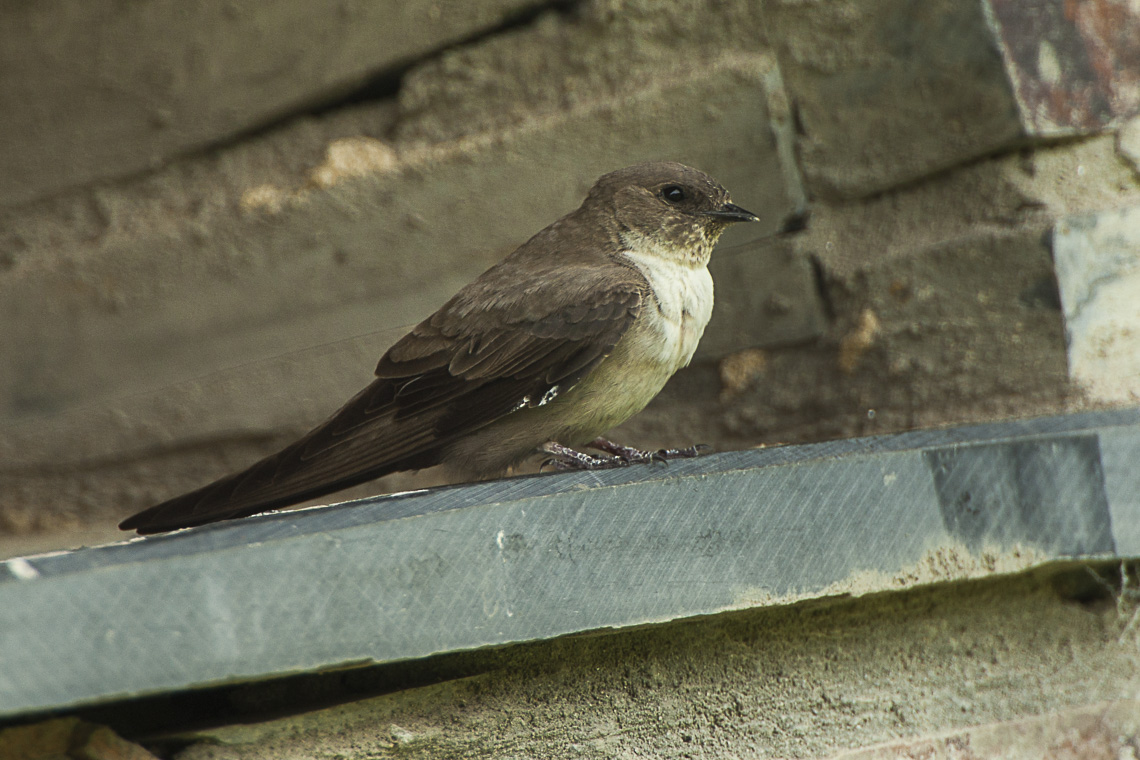

Conservation status
- Least Concern (IUCN 3.1)

Scientific classification
- Kingdom: Animalia
- Phylum: Chordata
- Class: Aves
- Order: Passeriformes
- Family: Hirundinidae
- Genus: Ptyonoprogne
- Species: P. rupestris

Binomial name
- Ptyonoprogne rupestris (Scopoli, 1769)
- Breeding range Resident year-round Non-breeding range

Synonyms
- Hirundo rupestris

= Eurasian crag martin =

Small passerine bird in the swallow family

The Eurasian crag martin or just crag martin (Ptyonoprogne rupestris) is a small passerine bird in the swallow family. It is about 14 cm (5.5 in) long with ash-brown upperparts and paler underparts, and a short, square tail that has distinctive white patches on most of its feathers. It breeds in the mountains of southern Europe, northwestern Africa and across the Palearctic. It can be confused with the three other species in its genus, but is larger with brighter tail spots and different plumage tone. Many European birds are resident, but some northern populations and most Asian breeders are migratory, wintering in northern Africa, the Middle East or India.

The Eurasian crag martin builds a nest adherent to the rock under a cliff overhang or increasingly onto a man-made structure. It makes a neat half-cup mud nest with an inner soft lining of feathers and dry grass. Nests are often solitary, although a few pairs may breed relatively close together at good locations. Two to five brown-blotched white eggs are incubated mainly by the female, and both parents feed the chicks. This species does not form large breeding colonies, but is gregarious outside the breeding season. It feeds on a wide variety of insects that it catches with its beak while flying near to cliff faces or over streams and alpine meadows. Adults and young may be hunted and eaten by birds of prey or corvids, and this species is a host of blood-sucking mites. With its large, expanding range and large population, there are no significant conservation concerns involving the species.

This bird is closely related to the other three crag martins which share its genus, and has sometimes been considered to be the same species as one or more of them, although it appears that there are areas where two species' ranges overlap without hybridisation occurring. All four Ptyonoprogne crag martins are quite similar in behaviour to other Old World swallows that build mud nests, and are sometimes subsumed into the larger genus Hirundo, but this approach leads to inconsistencies in classifying several other genera, particularly the house martins.

== Taxonomy ==
The Eurasian crag martin was formally described as Hirundo rupestris by Italian naturalist Giovanni Antonio Scopoli in 1769 and was moved to the new genus Ptyonoprogne by German ornithologist Heinrich Gustav Reichenbach in 1850. Its nearest relatives are the three other members of the genus, the pale crag martin, P. obsoleta, the rock martin, P. fuligula, and the dusky crag martin, P. concolor. The genus name is derived from the Greek ptuon (πτύον), "a fan", referring to the shape of the opened tail, and Procne (Πρόκνη), a mythological girl who was turned into a swallow. The specific rupestris means "of rocks", from the Latin rupes "rock". There are no generally recognised subspecies. Two races, Central Asian P. r. centralasica and P. r. theresae in the Atlas Mountains of Morocco, have been proposed, but the slight differences in size and colour show no consistent geographical pattern. Fossils of this species have been found in Late Pleistocene deposits in Bulgaria, and in central France in layers dated at 242,000 to 301,000 years ago.

The four Ptyonoprogne species are members of the swallow family, and are placed in the subfamily Hirundininae, which comprises all swallows and martins except the very distinctive river martins. DNA studies suggest that there are three major groupings within the Hirundininae, broadly correlating with the type of nest built. The groups are the "core martins" including burrowing species like the sand martin, the "nest-adopters", which are birds like the tree swallow that use natural cavities, and the "mud nest builders". The Ptyonoprogne species construct an open mud nest and therefore belong to the last group; Hirundo species also build open nests, Delichon house martins have a closed nest, and the Cecropis and Petrochelidon swallows have retort-like closed nests with an entrance tunnel.

Ptyonoprogne is closely related to the larger swallow genus Hirundo into which it is often subsumed, but a DNA analysis showed that an enlarged genus Hirundo should logically contain all the mud-builder genera, including the Delichon house martins, a practice which few authorities follow. Although the nests of the Ptyonoprogne crag martins resemble those of typical Hirundo species like the barn swallow, the research showed that if Delichon, Cecropis and Petrochelidon are split from Hirundo, Ptyonoprogne should also be treated as a separate genus.

== Description ==
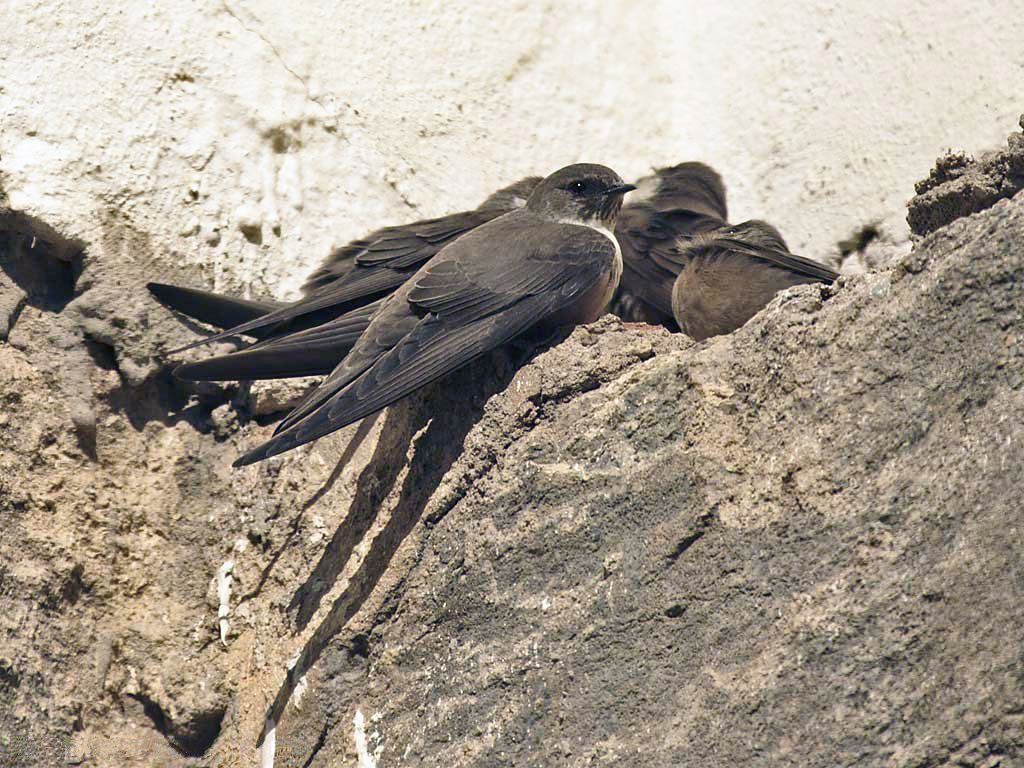
Group perched on a rocky surface

The Eurasian crag martin is 13–15 cm (5.1–5.9 in) long, with a 32–34.5 cm (12.6–13.6 in) wingspan, and weighs an average 23 g (0.81 oz). It has ash-brown upperparts and paler underparts, and has a broader body, wings and tail than any other European swallow. The tail is short and square, with white patches near the tips of all but the central and outermost pairs of feathers. The underwing and undertail coverts are blackish, the eyes are brown, the small bill is mainly black, and the legs are brownish-pink. The sexes are alike, but juveniles have buff-brown tips to the plumage of the head, upperparts and wing coverts. This species can be distinguished from the sand martin by its larger size, the white patches on the tail, and its lack of a brown breast band. Where the range overlaps with that of another Ptyonoprogne species, the Eurasian crag martin is darker, browner and 15% larger than the rock martin, and larger and paler, particularly on its underparts than the dusky crag martin. The white tail spots of the Eurasian crag martin are significantly larger than those of both its relatives.

The crag martin's flight appears relatively slow for a swallow. Rapid wing beats are interspersed with flat-winged glides, and its long flexible primaries give it the agility to manoeuvre near cliff faces. The average migration flight speed has been measured at 9.9 m/s (32.5 ft/s), less than the roughly 11 m/s (36 ft/s) typical for hirundines, but the data is limited. The bird often flies high, and shows the white spots as it spreads its tail. The vocalisations include short high pli, and piieh and tshir calls resembling those of the linnet and the house martin, respectively.

== Distribution and habitat ==
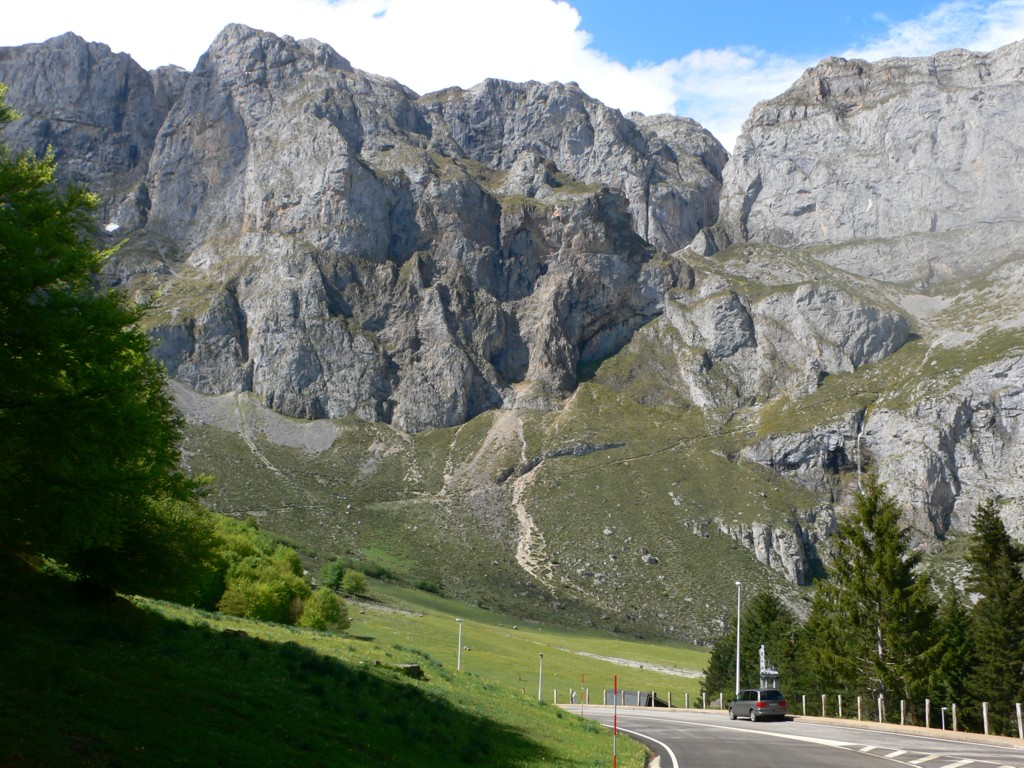
Breeding habitat in Spain

The Eurasian crag martin breeds in mountains from Iberia and northwesternmost Africa through southern Europe, the Persian Gulf and the Himalayas to southwestern and northeastern China. Northern populations are migratory, with European birds wintering in north Africa, Senegal, Ethiopia and the Nile Valley, and Asian breeders going to southern China, the Indian subcontinent and the Middle East. Some European birds stay north of the Mediterranean, and, like martins in warmer areas such as India, Turkey and Cyprus, just move to lower ground after breeding. The breeding range is bounded by the 20 °C (68 °F) July isotherm, and wintering areas need a temperature of about 15 °C (59 °F) for enough insect food to be available. This is a rare species any distance north of its breeding areas. For example, there are only 12 records from the UK, none from Ireland, and the first record for Sweden was reported as recently as 1996. South of its normal wintering range, it has occurred as a vagrant in The Gambia. In 2022, the first nesting of the species was recorded on the territory of Slovakia in the Malá Fatra National Park.

Crag martins breed on dry, warm and sheltered cliffs in mountainous areas with crags and gorges. The typical altitude is 2,000–2,700 m (6,600–8,900 ft) but breeding occurs up to 5,000 m (16,000 ft) in Central Asia. The Eurasian crag martin's choice of nest sites is very similar to that of Savi's pipistrelle, Hypsugo savii; the bird and the bat often breed in the same locations and have almost identical ranges in Europe. In South Asia, migrant Eurasian birds sometimes join with flocks of the dusky crag martin and roost communally on ledges of cliffs or buildings.

The largest known wintering roost of Eurasian crag martins has been recorded at the Gorham's Cave Complex in Gibraltar. The caves were home to a maximum of 12,000 birds during the 2020-2021 winter season; 1-2% of the entire European population of Eurasian crag martins.

== Behaviour ==
=== Breeding ===
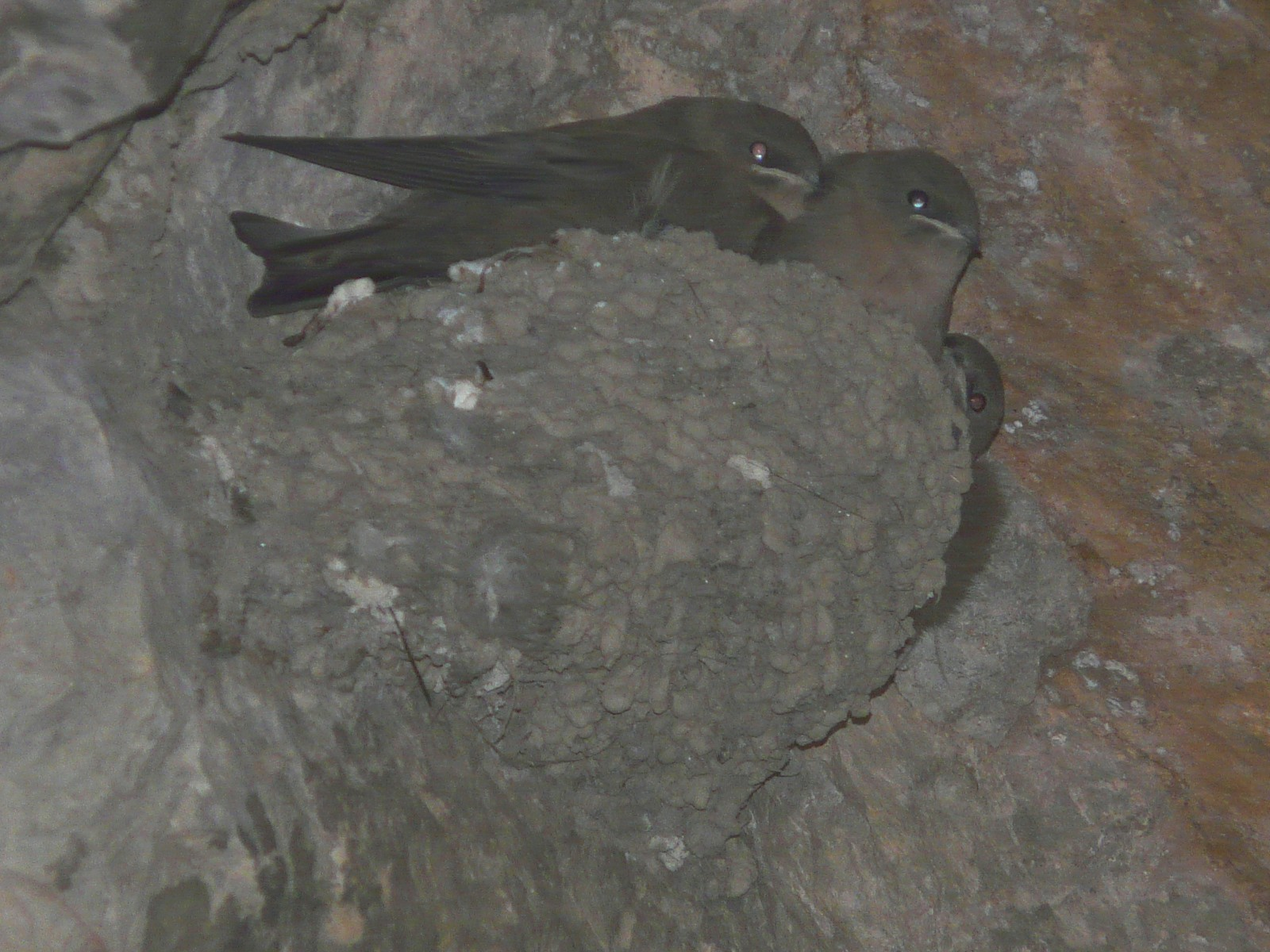
Nest with young

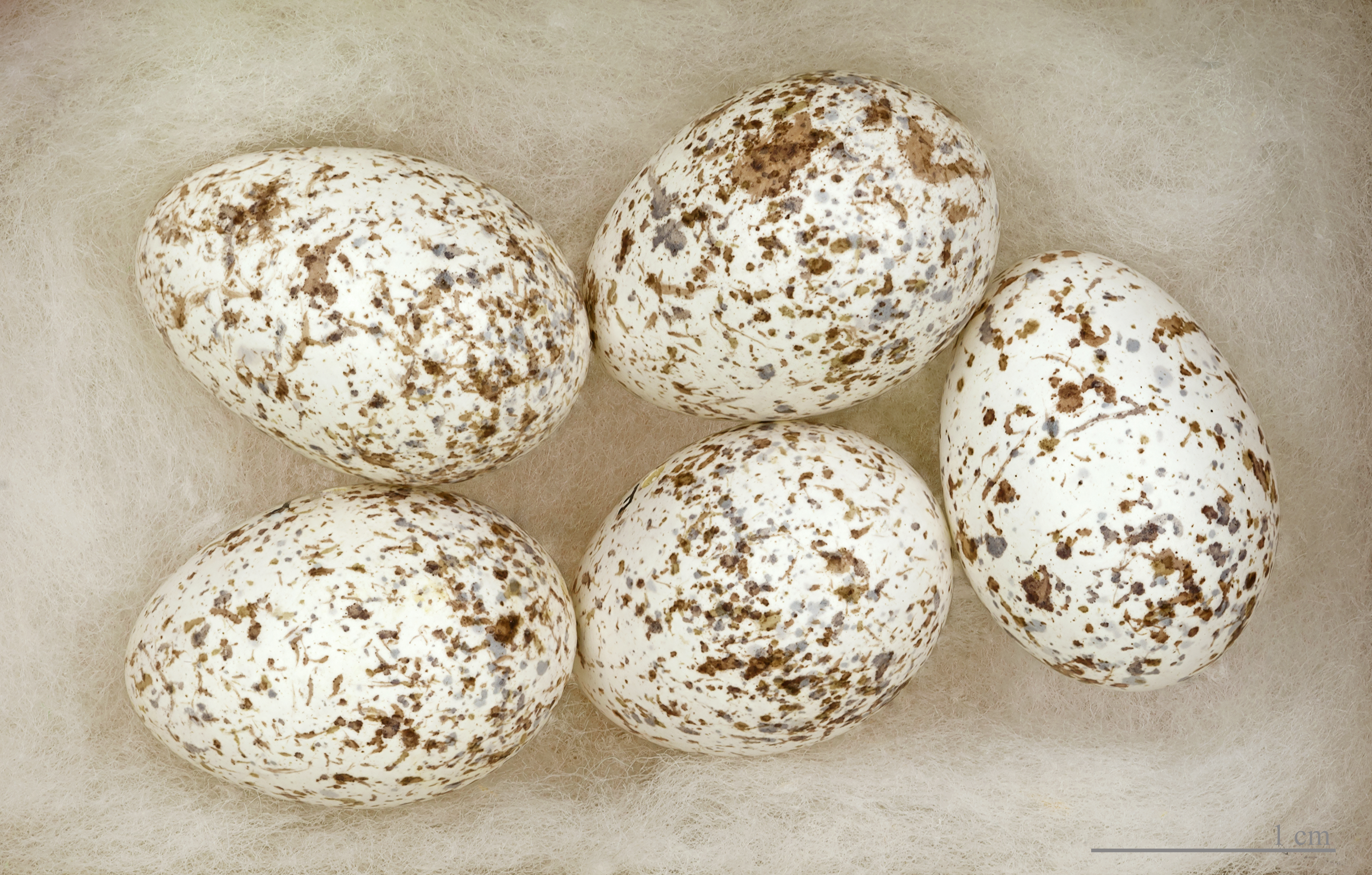
Ptyonoprogne rupestris – MHNT

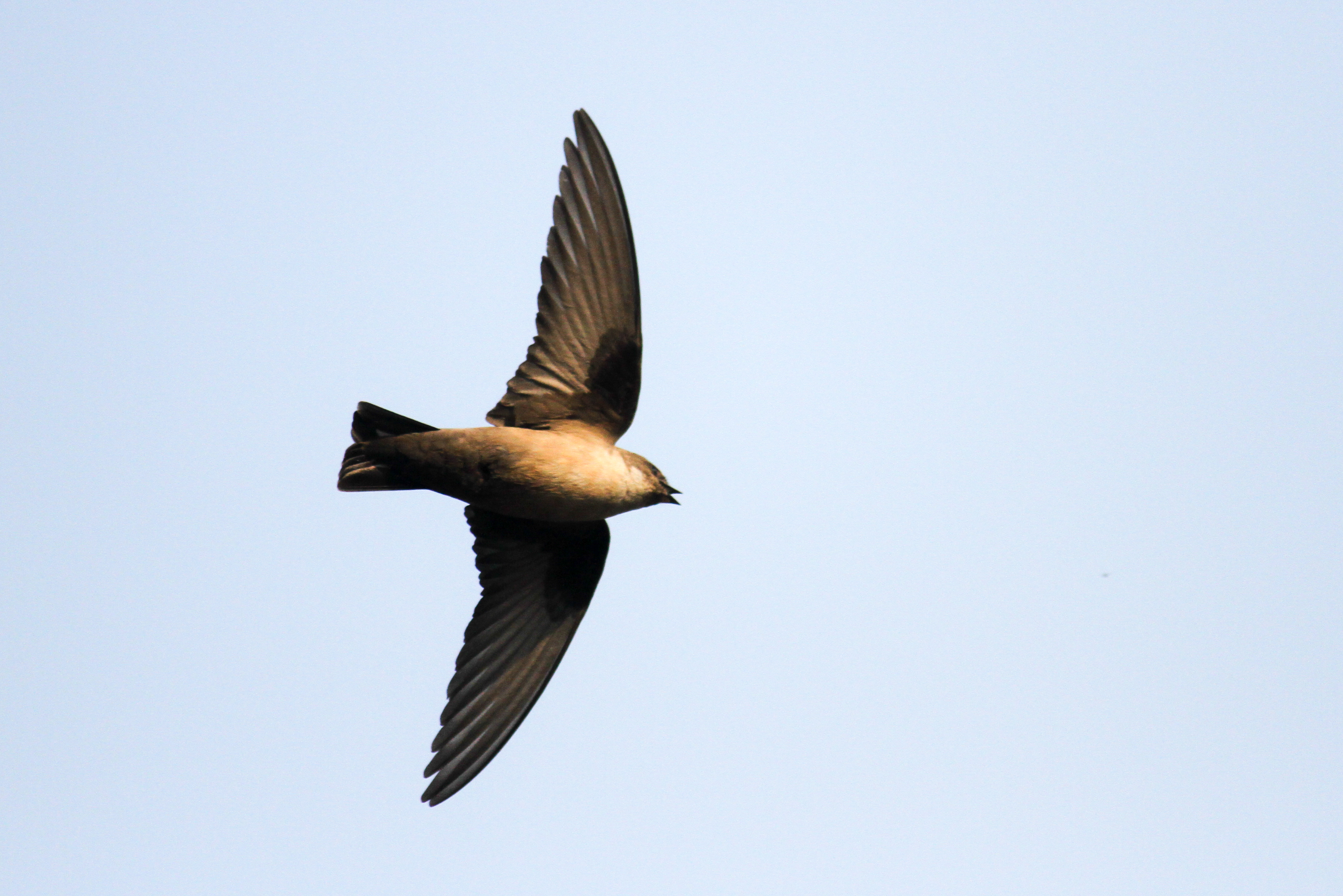
In flight

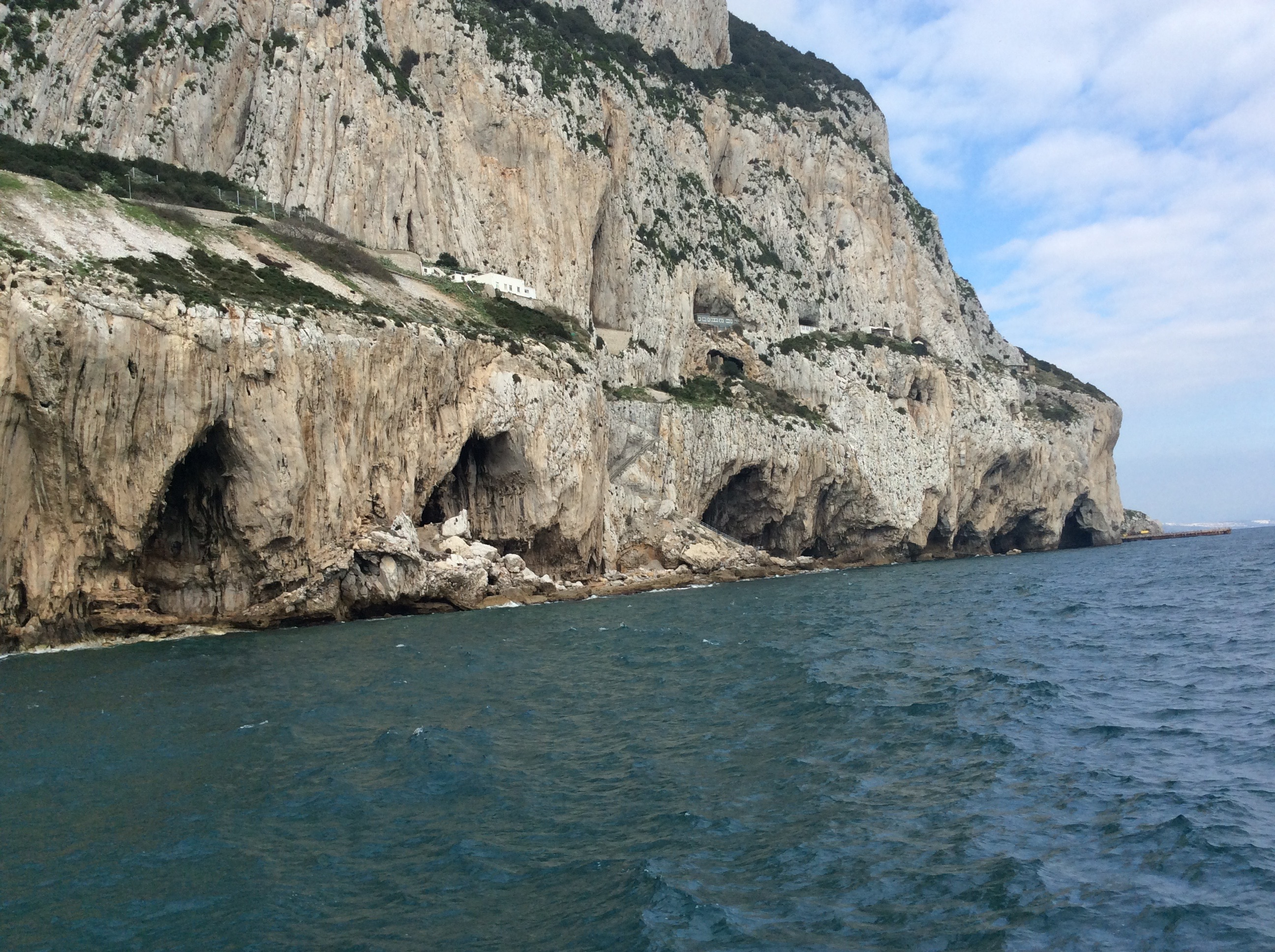
The Gorham's Cave Complex in Gibraltar holds the largest known wintering roost of Eurasian crag martins in the world

Crag martin pairs nest alone or in small colonies, usually containing fewer than ten nests. Nests are on average 30 m (98 ft) apart and each pair aggressively defends its breeding territory against other crag martins and most other bird species. Nesting takes place from May to August, and usually two broods are raised. The nest, built by both adults, is an open half cup made of mud and lined with soft material such as feathers or dry grass. It is constructed under an overhang on a rock cliff face, in a crevice or cave, or on a man-made structure. It takes one to three weeks to build and is re-used for the second brood and in subsequent years. The clutch is two to five eggs with an average of three. The eggs are white with brownish blotches particularly at the wide end, and average 20.2 mm × 14.0 mm (0.80 in × 0.55 in) with a weight of 2.08 g (0.073 oz). The eggs are incubated mainly by the female for 13–17 days to hatching, and the chicks take another 24–27 days to fledge. Both parents feed the chicks bringing food every two to five minutes, and the young are fed for 14–21 days after fledging. With such frequent feeding rates the adults mainly forage in the best hunting zones in the immediate vicinity of the nest, since the further they fly to forage the longer it would take to bring food to the chicks in the nest. In an Italian study, the hatching rate was 80.2 percent, and the average number of fledged young was 3.1.

The crag martin has over the last few decades increasingly used houses and other man-made sites to nest. This greater availability of breeding sites has enabled the species to expand its range, but it is possible that this will lead to competition with other hirundines, such as the barn swallow and common house martin, which also use artificial nest sites.

An Italian study showed that, as with other aerial feeders, the start of breeding was delayed by cold or wet weather, but this had no influence on the clutch size nor on the number of fledged young. Unexpectedly, it was found that once the eggs had hatched there was a negative relationship between temperature and the number of fledged young. The authors suggested that hot weather dried up the small rivers where the parents found food. Colony size did not influence the laying date, the clutch size or the number of successfully fledged young, but this species does not form large colonies anyway.

=== Feeding ===
The Eurasian crag martin feeds mainly on insects caught in its beak in flight, although it will occasionally take prey items off rocks, the ground, or a water surface. When breeding, birds often fly back and forth near to a rock face hunting for insects, feeding both inside and outside the nesting territory. At other times, they may hunt while flying above streams or alpine meadows. The insects taken depend on what is locally available and may include flies, ants, aerial spiders, and beetles. Aquatic species such as stoneflies, caddisflies and pond skaters appear to be important in at least Spain and Italy. Unlike other hirundines, these birds feed close to their breeding sites, and may be locally vulnerable to fluctuations in insect availability. This martin is gregarious outside the breeding season, and may form sizeable flocks where food is abundant. Cliff faces generate standing waves in the airflow which concentrate insects near vertical areas. The crag martin exploits the area close to the cliff when it hunts, relying on its high manoeuvrability and ability to perform tight turns.

=== Winter roost fidelity ===
Eurasian crag martins are known to form large roosts in winter, with the largest known roost being the Gorham's Cave Complex in Gibraltar. A study carried out at these caves and published in Scientific Reports in 2021, revealed that birds showed very high fidelity towards individual caves within and between years. Mark-recapture showed there was over a 90% chance of recapturing birds at the caves where they were first caught. The condition of birds from different caves suggests differences in roost quality which correlates to the fitness of Eurasian crag martins and, ultimately, survivorship.

== Predators and parasites ==
This species is occasionally hunted by the peregrine falcon, which shares its mountain habitat, and during its migration over the Himalayas, it is reported to be subject to predation by crows. Common kestrels, Eurasian sparrowhawks, Eurasian jays and common ravens are also treated as predators and attacked by repeated dives if they approach nesting cliffs. Despite the general aggressiveness of the crag martin, it tolerates sympatric common house martins, perhaps because the large numbers of that highly colonial species provide an early warning of predators.

The crag martin is a host of blood-sucking mites of the genus Dermanyssus, including D. chelidonis, and of the nasal mite Ptilonyssus ptyonoprognes. Two new species of parasites were first discovered on this martin, the fly Ornithomya rupes in Gibraltar and the flea Ceratophyllus nanshanensis from China.

== Status ==
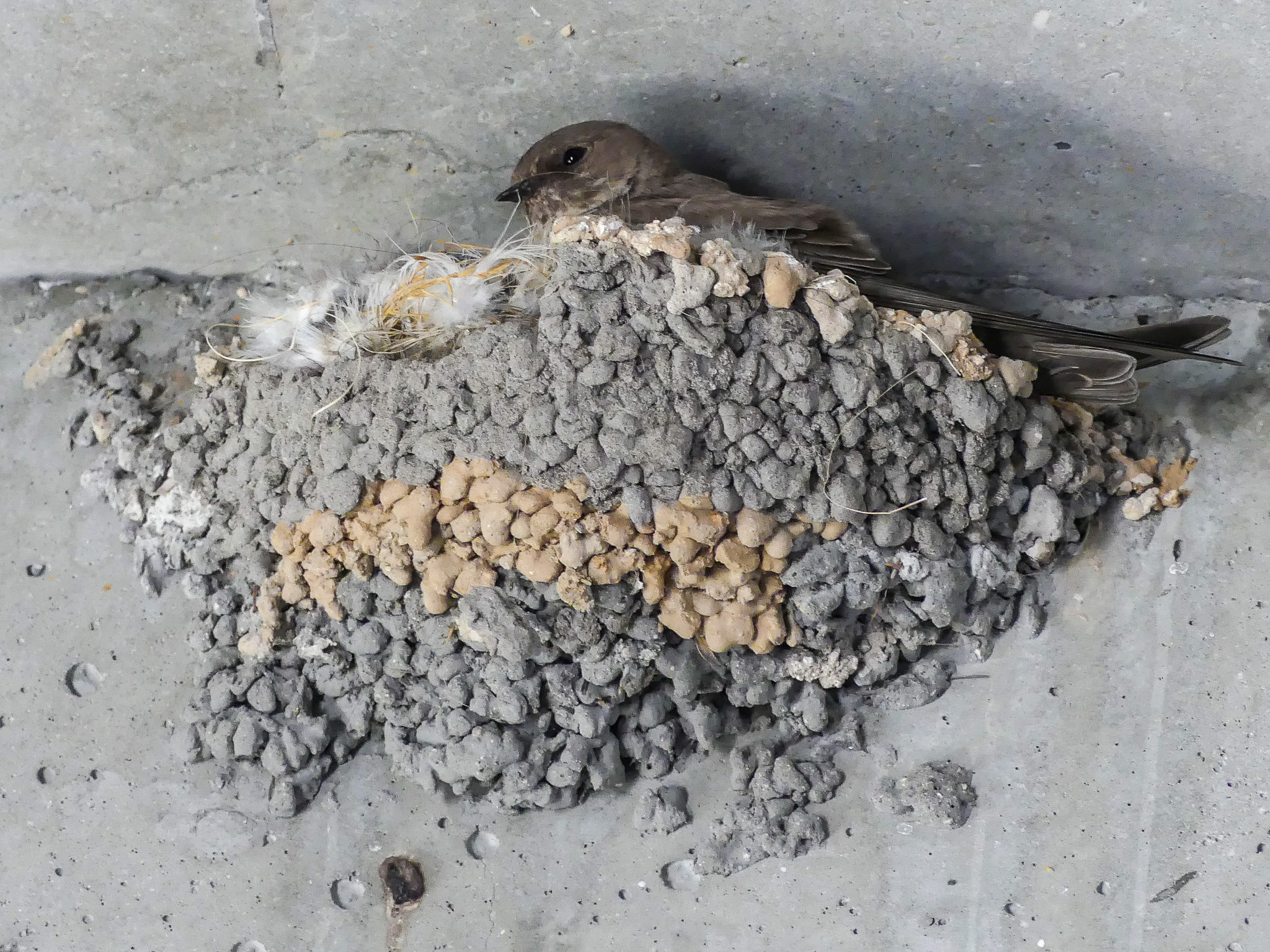
Eurasian Crag Martin nesting at Nice Airport

The European population of the Eurasian crag martin is estimated to be 360,000–1,110,000 individuals, including 120,000–370,000 breeding pairs. A rough estimate of the worldwide population is 500,000–5,000,000 individuals, with Europe hosting between one-quarter and one-half of the total. The population is estimated to be increasing following a northward expansion, which may be partly due to increased use of man-made structures as nest sites. Expansions of the range have been reported in Austria (where motorway bridges are used as nest sites), Switzerland, the former Yugoslavia, Romania, and Bulgaria. With its very large range and high numbers, the Eurasian crag martin is not considered to be threatened, and it is classed as Least Concern on the IUCN Red List.

== Cited texts ==
- Ali, Salim; Ripley, Sidney Dillon D (1986). Handbook of the birds of India and Pakistan. Vol. 5 (2nd ed.). Oxford: Oxford University Press. ISBN 0-19-561857-2.
- Grimmett, Richard; Inskipp, Carol; Inskipp, Tim (2002). Birds of India. London: Christopher Helm Publishers Ltd. p. 226. ISBN 0-7136-6304-9.
- Hume, Allan Octavian (1890). The nests and eggs of Indian birds. Vol. 2 (2nd ed.). London: R H Porter.
- Mullarney, Killian; Svensson, Lars; Zetterstrom, Dan; Grant, Peter (1999). Collins Bird Guide. London: HarperCollins. ISBN 0-00-219728-6.
- Rasmussen P C; Anderton, J C (2005). Birds of South Asia: The Ripley Guide. Vol. 2. Smithsonian Institution & Lynx Edicions. ISBN 84-87334-66-0.
- Reichenbach, Heinrich Gustav (1850). Avium systema naturale (in German). Dresden and Leipzig: F. Hofmeister.
- Scopoli, Giovanni Antonio (1769). Annus I Historico-Naturalis (in French). Lipsiae: Christian Gottlob Hischeri.
- Snow, David; Perrins, Christopher M, eds. (1998). The Birds of the Western Palearctic concise edition. (2 volumes). Oxford: Oxford University Press. ISBN 0-19-854099-X.
- Turner, Angela K; Rose, Chris (1989). A handbook to the swallows and martins of the world. London: Christopher Helm. ISBN 0-7470-3202-5.
