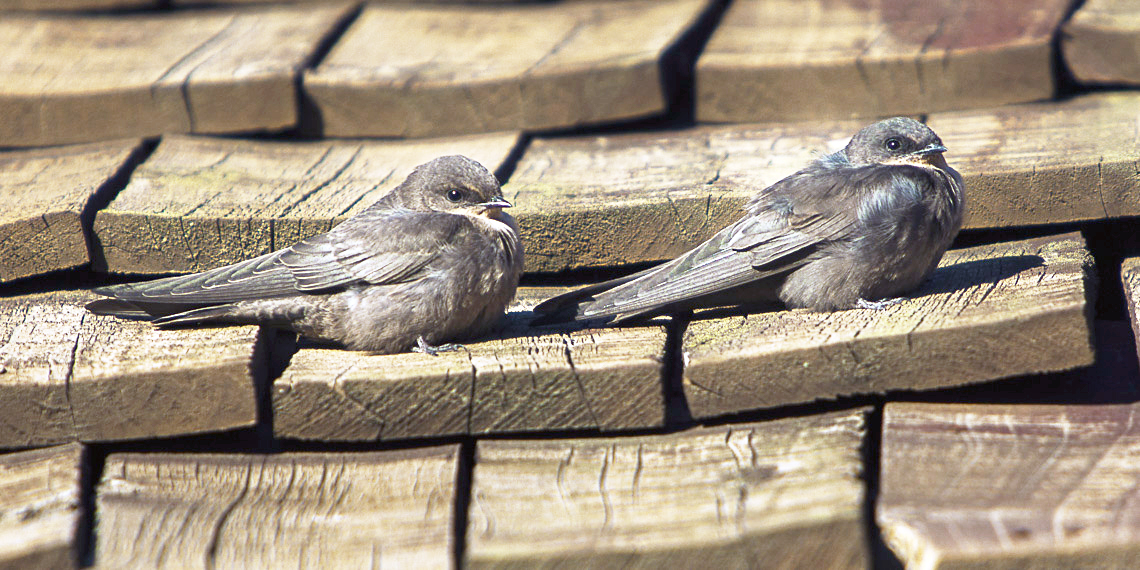
- In Kenya

Conservation status
- Least Concern (IUCN 3.1)

Scientific classification
- Kingdom: Animalia
- Phylum: Chordata
- Class: Aves
- Order: Passeriformes
- Family: Hirundinidae
- Genus: Ptyonoprogne
- Species: P. rufigula

Binomial name
- Ptyonoprogne rufigula (Fischer, GA & Reichenow, 1884)
- Range

= Red-throated rock martin =

Species of songbird

The red-throated rock martin (Ptyonoprogne rufigula), also known as the red-throated crag-martin, is a small passerine bird in the swallow family, Hirundinidae. It is found over a large area of Africa from Sierra Leone eastwards to Eritrea and Ethiopia and then south across East Africa to Zimbabwe and northern Mozambique. It was formerly considered to be a subspecies of the large rock martin.

== Taxonomy ==
The red-throated rock martin was formally described in 1884 by the explorer Gustav Fischer and the ornithologist Anton Reichenow based on a specimen collected in the highlands of Eritrea. They coined the binomial name Cotyle rufigula. It is now one of five martins placed in the genus Ptyonoprogne that was introduced in 1850 by German naturalist Ludwig Reichenbach. The genus name combines the Ancient Greek πτυον/ptuon meaning "fan" with Latin progne meaning "swallow". The specific epithet rufigula is from Latin rufus meaning "red" with gula meaning "throat". The red-throated rock martin was formerly considered to be a subspecies of the southern African large rock martin (Ptyonoprogne fuligula) with the English name "rock martin" for the combined taxa. The red-throated rock martin was elevated to species status based on morphological differences and phylogenomic analysis.

Three subspecies are recognised:

- Ptyonoprogne rufigula pusilla (Zedlitz, 1908) – south Mali to north Ethiopia and Eritrea
- Ptyonoprogne rufigula bansoensis (Bannerman, 1923) – Sierra Leone to Nigeria and Cameroon
- Ptyonoprogne rufigula rufigula (Fischer, GA & Reichenow, 1884) – north Nigeria and Chad to central Ethiopia south to Zimbabwe and north Mozambique
