= Hans Freiherr Geyr von Schweppenburg =

German forester and ornithologist (1884–1963)

Hans Freiherr Geyr von Schweppenburg (October 3, 1884 – August 24, 1963) was a German nobleman, arborist and ornithologist. He served as a professor of forestry at the Münden Forestry University from 1923 to 1938.

== Biography ==
Von Schweppenburg was born in Müddersheim south-east of Düren in the family of Baron Friedrich Leopold and his wife Sophie Countess von und zu Eltz. He went to the Rhenish Knights' Academy in Bedburg, finishing high school at the age of 17. By age 20 he had already published 15 scientific papers on bird, and the total rose to 250 between the first in 1901 and the last in 1963. He was particularly interested in bird migration, and for many years his studies of the red-breasted flycatcher (1911) and Eurasian siskin (1930) were the major works on those species. He then went to study in Bonn and Berlin, gaining a degree in forest science at the forest academies in Eberswalde and Münden. He became a forest assessor in 1912. He conducted studies on owls and their prey, identifying 20,000 vertebrate remains in owl pellets. He collaborated with Alexander Koenig (1858 - 1940) of the Bonn Museum and Otto le Roi (1878-1916). They then went on expeditions to expeditions to Spitzbergen and Bear Island in 1907, and in 1913 to the White Nile in Sudan. In 1914 he travelled to Algeria with Paul Spatz (1865 - 1942) collecting specimens during the travels. He returned and joined the army upon the outbreak of World War I. After the First Battle of the Marne, one leg had to be amputated and five years later the other also had to be amputated but learned to walk with artificial legs, and continued to work. He became a state forester and received a doctorate in 1923 on the subspecies concept. In 1924 he became a professor at Münden Forestry University, where he stayed until his retirement in 1938. He lived in the moated castle at Eicks in North Eifel. He had a special interest in bird migration and for many years his studies of the red-breasted flycatcher (1911) and Eurasian siskin (1930) were the major works on those species.

Geyr von Schweppenburg named some subspecies of birds, including the pale crag martin subspecies Ptyonoprogne obsoleta spatzi.

In 1933 he signed the Vow of allegiance of the Professors of the German Universities and High-Schools to Adolf Hitler and the National Socialistic State.
