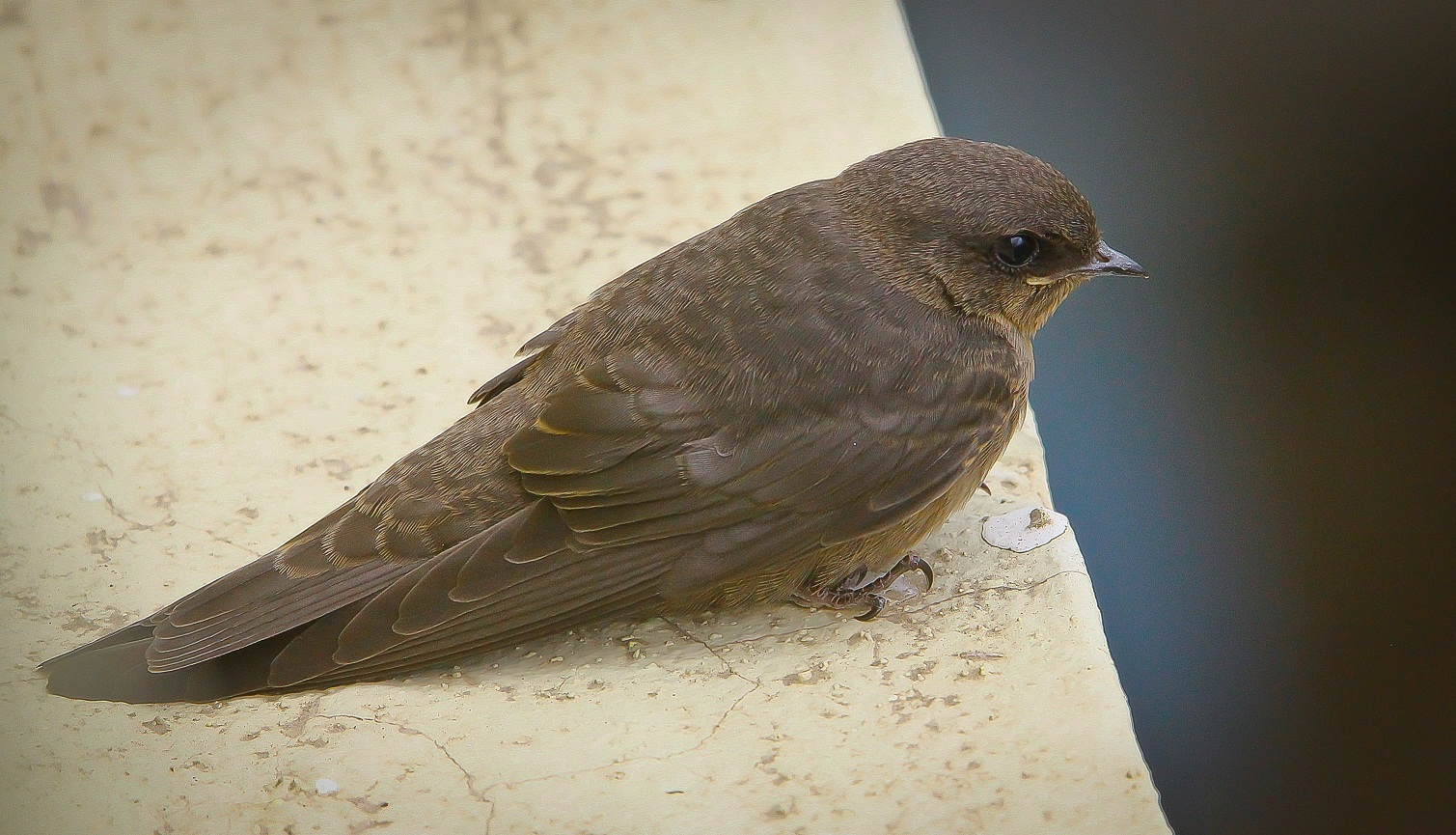
- At Purandar Fort, near Pune, India

Conservation status
- Least Concern (IUCN 3.1)

Scientific classification
- Kingdom: Animalia
- Phylum: Chordata
- Class: Aves
- Order: Passeriformes
- Family: Hirundinidae
- Genus: Ptyonoprogne
- Species: P. concolor

Binomial name
- Ptyonoprogne concolor (Sykes, 1832)
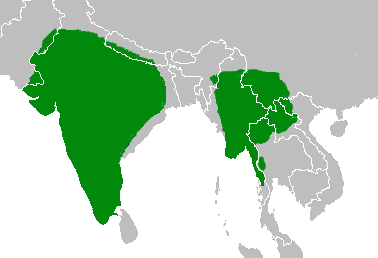
- Approximate range

Synonyms
- Hirundo concolor Cotyle concolor

= Dusky crag martin =

Species of bird

The dusky crag martin (Ptyonoprogne concolor) is a small passerine bird in the swallow family. It is about 13 cm (5 in) long with a broad body and wings, and a short square tail that has small white patches near the tips of most of its feathers. This martin has sooty-brown upperparts and slightly paler underparts. The two subspecies are resident breeding birds in South Asia from the Indian subcontinent to southwestern China and the northern parts of Thailand, Vietnam and Laos.

This martin nests under a cliff overhang or on a man-made structure, building a neat half-cup mud nest with a soft lining. Both adults incubate the two to four eggs and feed the chicks. This species does not form large breeding colonies, but it is more gregarious outside the breeding season. It feeds a wide variety of insects that are caught as the martin flies near to cliff faces. It may be hunted by large bats as well as birds of prey, but its extensive and expanding range and large population mean that there are no significant conservation concerns.

== Taxonomy ==
The dusky crag martin was formally described by in 1832 as Hirundo concolor by British soldier and ornithologist William Henry Sykes. It was moved to the new genus Ptyonoprogne by German ornithologist Heinrich Gustav Reichenbach in 1850. Its nearest relatives are the three other members of the genus, the rock martin P. fuligula, the pale crag martin, P. obsoleta, and the Eurasian crag martin P. rupestris. The genus name is derived from the Greek ptuon (πτύον), "a fan", referring to the shape of the opened tail, and Procne (Πρόκνη), a mythological girl who was turned into a swallow. The specific concolor is from Latin, con "together", and color "colour" and refers to the bird's uniform colouration.

The four Ptyonoprogne species are members of the swallow family of birds, and are classed as members of the subfamily Hirundininae which comprises all swallows and martins except the very distinctive river martins. DNA studies suggest that there are three major groupings within the Hirundininae, broadly correlating with the type of nest built. The groups are the "core martins" including burrowing species like the sand martin, the "nest-adopters", which are birds like the tree swallow that utilise natural cavities, and the "mud nest builders". The Ptyonoprogne species construct an open mud nest and therefore belong to the last group; Hirundo species also build open nests, Delichon house martins have a closed nest, and the Cecropis and Petrochelidon swallows have retort-like closed nests with an entrance tunnel.

The genus Ptyonoprogne is closely related to the larger swallow genus Hirundo into which it is often subsumed, but a DNA analysis showed that an enlarged Hirundo should contain all the mud-builder genera, including the Delichon house martins, a practice which few authorities follow. Although the nests of the Ptyonoprogne crag martins resemble those of typical Hirundo species like the barn swallow, the research showed that if Delichon, Cecropis and Petrochelidon are split from Hirundo, Ptyonoprogne should also be considered as a separate genus.

In Pakistan, the breeding range of the dusky crag martin overlaps that of the subspecies P. f. peloplasta of pale crag martin, but that species breeds much higher in the mountains. This altitudinal separation means that it is not known whether the two closely related martins could hybridise, which would cast doubts as to whether they were distinct species. Dusky crag martins from Burma and Thailand have been described as a separate darker subspecies, P. c. sintaungensis (originally Krimnochelidon concolor sintaungensis, Baker, 1832), but it is not clear that the difference is greater than that between individual martins of the nominate subspecies.

== Description ==
The dusky crag martin is 13 cm (5 in) long with a broad body, wings and tail. It has sooty-brown upperparts and slightly paler underparts, with a streaked pale dull rufous chin, throat and foreneck. The tail is short and square, with small white patches near the tips of all but the central and outermost pairs of feathers. The underwing coverts are dark brown, the eyes are brown, the small bill is mainly black, and the legs are brownish-pink. The sexes are alike, but juveniles have rufous grey tips to the plumage of the upperparts and wings. This species can be distinguished from the Eurasian crag martin and rock martin by its darker underparts, and its white tail spots are significantly smaller than those of the Eurasian crag martin. The under-tail coverts are of the same shade as the underside of the abdomen but these are darker in the Eurasian crag martin.

This small martin's flight is typically slow and leisurely, but it is capable of considerable speed when required. The calls are similar to those of the Eurasian crag martin and include a soft chi, chi contact call and a twittering song.

== Distribution and habitat ==
The nominate subspecies of the dusky crag martin breeds in much of the Indian subcontinent from the base of the Himalayas south to the Nilgiri mountains and east to West Bengal, and P. c. sintaungensis is found in southwestern China, and the northern parts of Thailand, Vietnam and Laos. The dusky crag martin is largely resident apart from local movements after breeding, but it has bred in Malaysia at least once, and occurred as a vagrant to Sri Lanka and probably Borneo.

The natural breeding habitat is hilly or mountainous country with cliffs, gorges and caves, with nesting typically up to an altitude of about 1,800 m (5,900 ft), although up to 2,000 m (6,600 ft) in Thailand. This martin also breeds in lowland areas utilising man-made structures as a substitute for natural precipices. Stone buildings such as old forts are particularly favoured, and the dusky crag martin can be found in urban areas including Mumbai. Nests on buildings can be 30 m (98 ft) from the ground, and include unusual sites such as light fittings.

== Behaviour ==
=== Breeding ===
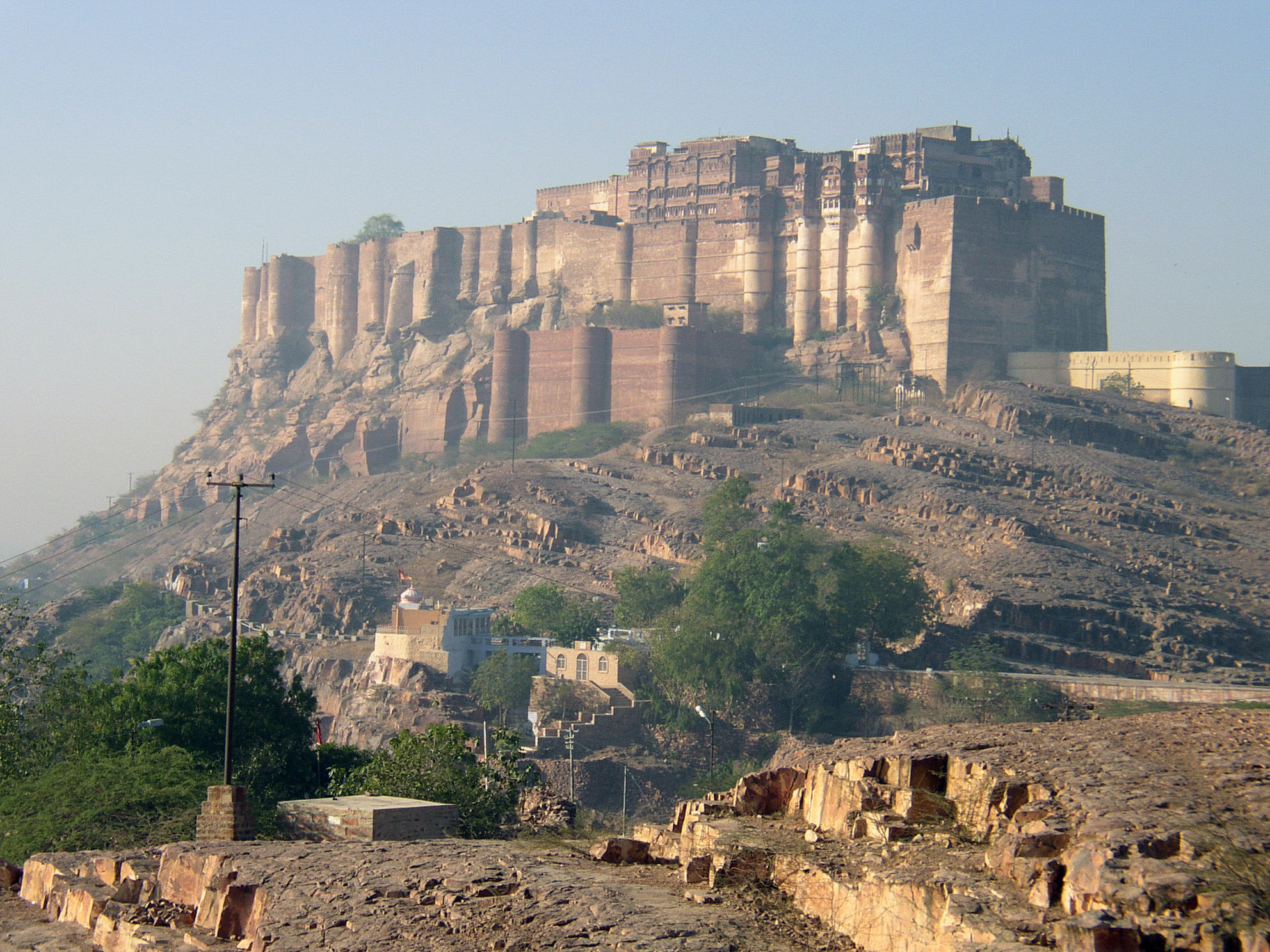
Old forts provide alternative nest sites to natural cliffs

Dusky crag martin pairs typically nest alone, although in suitable locations several pairs may be quite close to each other. The natural nesting habitat is under ledges on cliff faces or river banks, but man-made structures are readily used. Stone buildings such as old hill forts, mosques and tombs are preferred, and other artificial sites include bridges, archways and culverts. Breeding has been reported in every month, but mainly in February and March, and again after the rains start in July and August; usually two broods are raised. The nest, built by both adults, is an open half-cup made of mud and lined with soft material such as feathers or dry grass. It is constructed under an overhang or in a crevice on a cliff or man-made structure, and is re-used for the second brood and in subsequent years. The clutch is two to four eggs, white with reddish brown blotches particularly at the wide end, and averaging 17.7 mm × 13.0 mm (0.70 in × 0.51 in) with a weight of 1.57 g (0.055 oz). Both adults incubate the eggs and feed the chicks. Incubation and nestling periods are unknown but assumed to be similar to those of the Eurasian crag martin (13–17 days to hatching, and 24–27 days to fledge).

=== Feeding ===
The dusky crag martin feeds mainly on insects caught in flight. When nesting, birds often fly back and forth near to a rock face or building hunting for their prey. This martin is more gregarious outside the breeding season, and may form small flocks where food is abundant. Vertical surfaces are preferred for hunting, and a study of the Eurasian crag martin, which has a similar foraging technique, showed that cliff faces generate standing waves in the airflow which concentrate insects near vertical areas. The martin exploits the area close to the cliff when it hunts, relying on its high manoeuvrability and ability to perform tight turns. When feeding young, foraging is concentrated on the profitable patches in the immediate vicinity of the nest, since there is a negative correlation between foraging distance and feeding rate.

== Predators and parasites ==
In addition to predation by birds of prey such as the peregrine falcon, this small martin has been recorded in the diet of the greater false vampire bat, Megaderma lyra.

== Status ==
The total population of the dusky crag martin has not been quantified, but it is suspected to be increasing owing to the availability of artificial nest sites. This martin is locally common in India, Thailand, and southern China, and there appear to be range extensions to the northeast into Guangxi, southwards into lowland Laos, and westwards to the hills and plains of Sindh. There is also a recent unconfirmed report from Cambodia. Its large range and presumed high numbers mean that the dusky crag martin is not considered to be threatened, and it is classed as Least Concern on the IUCN Red List.

== Cited texts ==
- Ali, Salim; Ripley, Sidney Dillon (1986). Handbook of the birds of India and Pakistan. Vol. 5 (2nd ed.). Oxford University Press. ISBN 0-19-561857-2.
- Baker, E C S (1926). Fauna of British India. Birds. Vol. 3 (2nd ed.). Taylor and Francis, London.
- Hume, Allan Octavian (1890). The nests and eggs of Indian birds. Vol. 2 (2nd ed.). R H Porter, London.
- Lekagul, Boonsong; Round, Philip (1991). A Guide to the Birds of Thailand. Saha Karn Baet. ISBN 974-85673-6-2.
- Rasmussen P C; Anderton, J C (2005). Birds of South Asia: The Ripley Guide. Vol. 2. Smithsonian Institution & Lynx Edicions. ISBN 84-87334-66-0.
- Reichenbach, Heinrich Gustav (1850). Avium systema naturale (in German). Dresden and Leipzig: F. Hofmeister.
- Robson, Craig (2004). A Field Guide to the Birds of Thailand. New Holland Press. ISBN 1-84330-921-1.
- Turner, Angela K; Rose, Chris (1989). A handbook to the swallows and martins of the world. Christopher Helm. ISBN 0-7470-3202-5.
