= Sheldon (name) =

Sheldon is an English surname, as well as a masculine given name, combining the Old English scelf (rock ledge shelf) and the place name haddon, which in turn comes from the words hǣth (heath) and dūn (hill; but also, valley). Popular family history groups and notable people with the name include:

== Popular Sheldon surname family history groups ==
- UK Sheldon Association www.sheldonfamily.org.uk
- Sheldon Genealogy www.sheldongenealogy.org
- USA Sheldon Family Association www.sheldonfamily.org

== Given name ==
- Sheldon Adelson (1933–2021), American billionaire businessman
- Sheldon Arnold (born 2002), American football player
- Sheldon Bach (1925–2021), American psychologist
- Shel Bachrach (1944–2024), American insurance broker, investor, businessman and philanthropist
- Shelley Berman (1925–2017), American comedian, born Sheldon
- Sheldon Birch, American politician
- Sheldon Blockburger (born 1964), American decathlete
- Sheldon Brookbank (born 1980), Canadian hockey player
- Sheldon Brooks (1811–1883), American businessman, physician, and politician
- Sheldon Brown (American football) (born 1979), American football player
- Sheldon Brown (artist) (born 1962), American artist and professor of computer art
- Sheldon Brown (bicycle mechanic) (1944–2008), American bicycle mechanic, writer, and webmaster
- Sheldon Burnside (born 1954), American baseball player
- Sheldon Canley (born 1968), American football player
- Sheldon Clare, Canadian politician
- Sheldon S. Cohen (1927–2018), American lawyer
- Sheldon Creed (born 1997), American racing driver
- Sheldon Day (born 1994), American football player
- Sheldon Drobny (1945–2020), American investor
- Sheldon V. Ekman (1920–1982), United States Tax Court judge
- Sheldon Gaines (born 1964), American football player
- Sheldon Glashow (born 1932), American 1979 winner of the Nobel Prize in Physics
- Sheldon Harnick (1924–2023), American lyricist
- Sheldon Lejeune (1885–1962), American baseball player
- Sheldon Jackson (1834–1909), American missionary
- Sheldon Jackson (American football) (born 1976), American football player
- Sheldon Jackson (cricketer) (born 1986), Indian cricketer
- Sheldon Jones (1922–1991), American baseball player
- Sheldon Kennedy (born 1969), Canadian hockey player
- Sheldon Lavin (1932–2023), American billionaire and owner, CEO and chairman of OSI Group
- Sheldon Leonard (1907–1997), American actor
- Sheldon Mallory (born 1953), American baseball player
- Sheldon Neuse (born 1994), American baseball player
- Sheldon Price (born 1991), American football player
- Sheldon Rankins (born 1994), American football player
- Sheldon Richardson (born 1990), American football player
- Sheldon Silver (1944–2022), United States politician
- Shel Silverstein (1930–1999), American poet, songwriter, cartoonist, and children's book author
- Sheldon Souray (born 1976), Canadian hockey player
- Sheldon van der Linde (born 1999), South African racing driver
- Sheldon White (born 1965), American football player and executive
- Sheldon Whitehouse (born 1955), Democratic United States Senator from Rhode Island

== Surname ==
- Alice Sheldon (1915-1987), American Science Fiction author.
- Alexander Sheldon (1766–1832), Speaker of the New York State Assembly
- A J Sheldon (1874–1931), English music critic
- Benjamin R. Sheldon (1811–1897), American jurist
- Bob Sheldon (born 1950), American baseball player
- Brady Sheldon (born 1993), American football player
- Brooke E. Sheldon (1931–2013), American librarian
- Charles Sheldon (1857–1946), American Congregationalist minister
- Charles H. Sheldon (1840–1898), American politician
- Chris Sheldon (born 1962), English record producer
- David Sheldon (disambiguation), various people
- Dominic Sheldon, Anglo-Irish soldier
- Donald Sheldon (1921–1975), Alaskan bush pilot
- Edward Sheldon (1886–1946), American dramatist
- Fred Sheldon (English footballer) (1871–?), English footballer for Stoke
- Fred Sheldon (Welsh footballer), Welsh footballer for Aberdare Athletic
- Frederick H. Sheldon (born 1951), American ornithologist
- Gene Sheldon (Eugene Hume) (1908–1982), American pantomime actor
- George Sheldon (preservationist) (1818–1916), American historian, judge, and politician
- George L. Sheldon (1870–1960), American politician
- Gilbert Sheldon (1598–1677), Archbishop of Canterbury and builder of the Sheldonian Theatre
- Grace Carew Sheldon (1855–1921), American journalist, author, editor, businesswoman
- Henry D. Sheldon (1874–1948), American educator
- Ingrid Sheldon (born 1945), American politician
- Jack Sheldon (1931–2019), American jazz trumpeter
- Jacy Sheldon (born 2001), American basketball player
- James M. Sheldon, (1880–1965), American football player
- Jane Sheldon, Australian soprano
- Jennie Maria Arms Sheldon (1852–1938), American entomologist, educator, and museum curator
- Joseph Harold Sheldon (1893–1972), English physician and gerontologist
- Lee Sheldon (writer), game developer and writer
- Lewis Sheldon (1874–1960), American triple jumper
- Lilian Sheldon (1862–1942), English zoologist
- Lionel Allen Sheldon (1828–1917), American Civil War general, politician, lawyer
- Louis P. Sheldon (1934–2020), American Presbyterian pastor and activist
- Lurana W. Sheldon (1862–1945), American writer, editor, suffragist
- Matthew Sheldon (born 1992), American soccer player
- Mike Sheldon (born 1973), American football player
- Oliver Sheldon (1894–1951), British businessman
- Robert Sheldon, Baron Sheldon (1923–2020), British politician
- Roland "Rollie" Sheldon (1936–2026), American baseball player
- Sam Sheldon (born 1989), Australian footballer
- Scott Sheldon (born 1968), American baseball player
- Sidney Sheldon (1917–2007), American screenwriter and novelist
- Stagger Lee Sheldon (1865–1912), American murderer
- Steve Sheldon, American politician
- Wilfrid Percy Henry Sheldon, (1901–1983), English consulting physician
- William Herbert Sheldon, (1899–1977), American psychologist
- William Wallace Barbour Sheldon (1836–1915), American architect
- Wilmon Henry Sheldon (1875–1981), American philosopher

== Fictional characters ==
- Paul Sheldon, character from the novel Misery
- Sheldon Cooper, character from the television series The Big Bang Theory and the prequel series Young Sheldon
- Sheldon Lee, a character in My Life as a Teenage Robot
- Sheldon J. Plankton, a character in the animated television series SpongeBob SquarePants
- Sheldon (webcomic), a daily webcomic
- Shelldon, snail in the animated series of the same title
- Sheldon Wallace, a character from Private Practice

== Animals ==
- Sheldon, a chimpanzee featured in several books and documentaries

== See also ==
- Governor Sheldon (disambiguation)
- Senator Sheldon (disambiguation)
- Shel, a list of people with the given name, most actually named Sheldon
