= Shell =

Shell or Shells may refer to:

== Architecture and design ==
- Shell (structure), a thin structure
  - Concrete shell, a thin shell of concrete, usually with no interior columns or exterior buttresses

== Science ==
=== Biology ===
- Seashell, a hard outer layer of a marine animal, found on beaches
- Eggshell
- Nutshell
- Exoskeleton, an external covering of some animals
  - Mollusc shell
    - Bivalve shell
    - Gastropod shell
  - Shell, of a brachiopod
- Turtle shell
- Armadillo shell

=== Physics and chemistry ===
- Electron shell or a principal energy level of electrons outside an atom's nucleus
- Nuclear shell model, a principal energy level of nucleons within an atom's nucleus
- On shell and off shell, quantum field theory concepts depending on whether classical equations of motion are obeyed

=== Mathematics ===
- Spherical shell, between two concentric spheres

== Organisations ==
- Shell plc formerly Royal Dutch Shell plc, a British multinational oil and gas company
  - Shell Oil Company or Shell USA
  - Shell Australia
  - Shell Canada
  - Shell Nigeria
- Shell corporation, a type of company that serves as a vehicle for business transactions

== Computing ==
- Shell (computing), a type of user interface and command-line interpreter
  - Command-line interface, sometimes referred to as command shell
  - List of command-line interpreters, programs occasionally referred to as shells
  - Web shell, interface that enables a web server to be remotely accessed
  - Unix shell, a shell for Unix-like operating systems
  - Shell script, a computer program designed to be run by a shell
  - Bash (Unix shell)
  - Bourne shell
- Read–eval–print loop, also known as a language shell
- Shell account, a user account on a remote server
- Secure Shell, cryptographic network protocol
- Shellsort or Shell sort, a sorting algorithm by Donald Shell
- Shell, an empty expert system

== Entertainment ==
- Shell (2012 film), an independent drama film
- Shell (2024 film), an American thriller film
- Shell (theater), a curved surface for reflecting sound
- The Shells, a musical group
- "Shell (Of a Man)", a song by Saya Gray from SAYA, 2025
- "Shells" (Angel), a TV episode
- "The Shell" (The Amazing World of Gumball), a TV episode
- Shell, a receptacle used in the Shell game
- "Shell", a song by Arrested Development from Zingalamaduni

== Places ==
- Shell, Ecuador
- Shell, Worcestershire, England
- Shell, Wyoming, United States
- Shell Lake (disambiguation), several places

== Weaponry ==
- Shell (projectile), an explosive device fired from artillery
- Shotgun shell, a type of shotgun ammunition

== Persons with the surname Shell ==
- Art Shell (born 1946), American football player and coach
- Brandon Shell (born 1992), American football player
- Donald Shell (1924–2015), American computer scientist
- Donnie Shell (born 1952), American football player
- George Shell (disambiguation)
- Karl Shell (born 1938), American economist
- Rita Shell (1863–1950), British magazine editor

== Other uses ==
- Racing shell, a watercraft
- Shell (machinery), each half of a two-piece plain bearing
- Coverage shell, the number of defenders guarding the deep portion of the field in American football
- Conchiglie, a type of pasta

== See also ==
- Shell suit, a descendant of the tracksuit
- Shel, a given name
- Shels (disambiguation)
