= Shels =

Shels may refer to:

- *shels, rock band
- Shelbourne F.C., Irish association football club

== See also ==
- Shel, a given name
- Shells (disambiguation)
