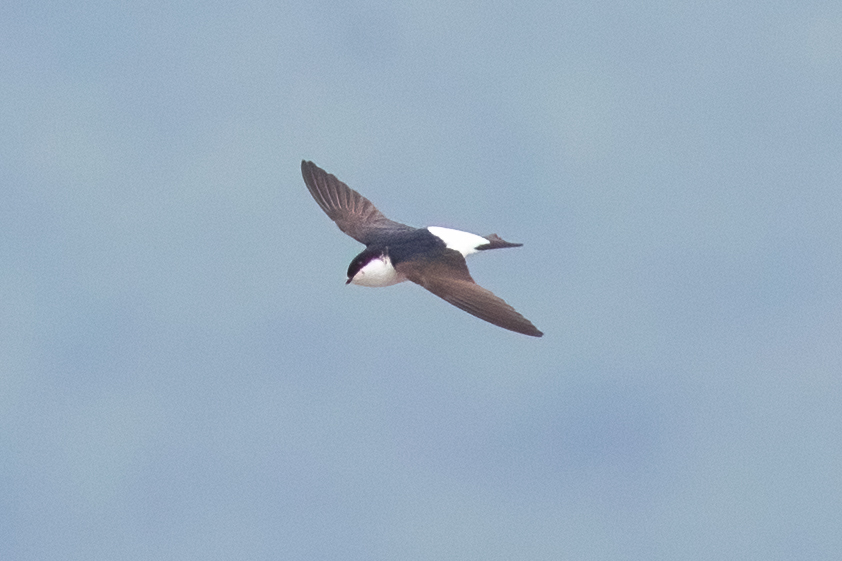

Conservation status
- Least Concern (IUCN 3.1)

Scientific classification
- Kingdom: Animalia
- Phylum: Chordata
- Class: Aves
- Order: Passeriformes
- Family: Hirundinidae
- Genus: Delichon
- Species: D. lagopodum

Binomial name
- Delichon lagopodum (Pallas, 1811)

= Siberian house martin =

Species of bird

The Siberian house martin or eastern house martin (Delichon lagopodum) is a passerine bird in the swallow family Hirundinidae. It breeds in rocky areas of northeastern Russia, Mongolia and northern China and winters in Myanmar, Laos, Vietnam and Cambodia. It was formerly considered conspecific with the western house martin.

== Taxonomy ==
The Siberian house martin was formally described in 1811 by the German naturalist Peter Simon Pallas under the binomial name Hirundo lagopoda. He specified the locality as Dauria, a mountainous region to the east of Lake Baikal in Russia. The specific epithet combines the Ancient Greek lagōs meaning "hare" with pous, podos meaning foot, a reference to the Siberian martin's fully-feathered feet. The Siberian house martin is now placed in the genus Delichon. This martin was formerly considered to be a subspecies of the common house martin but was promoted to species status based on morphological and vocal differences. The species is monotypic: no subspecies are recognised.
