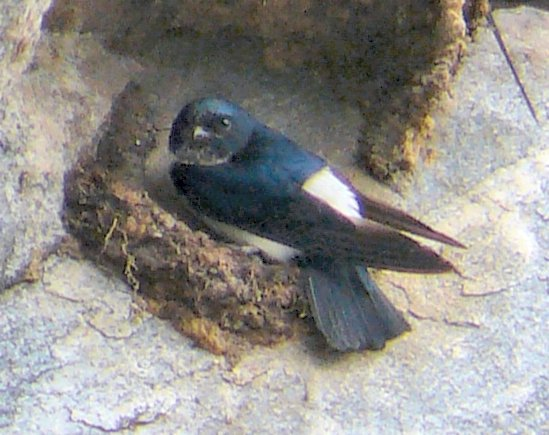
- At nest site in Bhutan

Conservation status
- Least Concern (IUCN 3.1)

Scientific classification
- Kingdom: Animalia
- Phylum: Chordata
- Class: Aves
- Order: Passeriformes
- Family: Hirundinidae
- Genus: Delichon
- Species: D. nipalense

Binomial name
- Delichon nipalense Moore, F, 1854
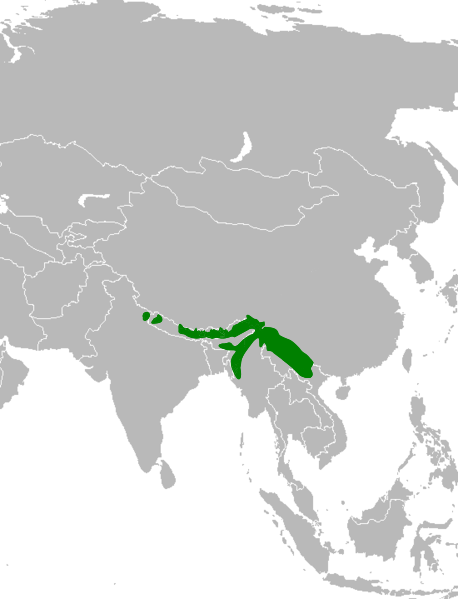
- Resident range

= Nepal house martin =

Species of bird

The Nepal house martin (Delichon nipalense) is a non-migratory passerine of the swallow family Hirundinidae. Its two subspecies breed in the Himalayas from northwestern India through Nepal to Myanmar, northern Vietnam, and just into China. It occurs in river valleys and rugged wooded mountain ridges at heights between 1,000–4,000 m (3,300–13,100 ft) altitude, where it nests in colonies beneath overhangs on vertical cliffs, laying three or four white eggs in an enclosed mud nest.

This martin has blue-black upperparts with a contrasting white rump, and white underparts. It resembles its close relatives, the Asian house martin and common house martin, but unlike those species it has a black throat and black undertail. It feeds in flocks with other swallows, catching flies and other insects in flight. It is subject to predation and parasites, but its status within its limited range appears secure.

== Taxonomy ==
The Nepal house martin was first described by British entomologist Frederic Moore in 1854, and placed in a new genus Delichon created by Moore and American naturalist Thomas Horsfield. The specimen or its description was attributed by Moore to Brian Houghton Hodgson and early literature sometimes refers to it as Hodgson's martin. Some older taxonomic sources such as those by S D Ripley specify the binomial author as "Hodgson = Moore in Horsfield & Moore, 1854". Its closest relatives are the two other members of the genus, the Asian house martin and the common house martin. This martin has a distinctive subspecies, D. n. cuttingi, described by American biologist Ernst W. Mayr in 1941 from a specimen taken near the Burma-Yunnan border. White-throated birds in the southern extension of the range are similar in appearance to the nominate subspecies, but because of their geographical separation are sometimes considered to be a third race, D. n. bartletti. Delichon is an anagram of the Ancient Greek term χελιδών (chelīdōn), meaning "swallow", and nipalense refers to Nepal, where the type specimen was obtained.

== Distribution and habitat ==
The nominate subspecies D. n. nipalense breeds in the Himalayas from Garhwal east through Nepal, north-eastern India and Bangladesh as far as western Myanmar. The race D. n. cuttingi is found in northern Myanmar, along Myanmar's border with Chinese Yunnan and in northern Tonkin, Vietnam. The Nepal house martin is largely resident, but may move to lower altitudes when not breeding, and has been occasionally recorded in northern Thailand in winter. The range in Thailand is poorly known.

The habitat is river valleys and wooded ridges at 1,000–4,000 m (3,300–13,100 ft) altitude, although mainly below 3,000 m (9,800 ft). When not breeding, birds typically descend to 300 m (980 ft), and occasionally to 150 m (490 ft). The range of this species overlaps with that of the nominate subspecies of Asian house martin, although they breed at different altitudes. The height separation and the small differences in appearance seem sufficient to prevent interbreeding.

== Description ==
The adult Nepal house martin is 13 cm (5.1 in) long, mainly blue-black above and white below. It has a contrasting pure white rump, the tail and upperwings are brownish-black, and the underwings are grey-brown. The legs and feet are brownish-pink and covered with white feathers, the eyes are brown, and the bill is black. The chin is black but the extent varies clinally. In the northeast of the range, birds of the race D. n. cuttingi have black on the whole of the throat and the uppermost breast, but further west or south the black increasingly becomes restricted to the chin. There are no differences in appearance between the sexes, but the juvenile bird is less glossy and has a duskier throat and buff-washed underparts.

The eastern form D. n. cuttingi has a wing length of 99–106 mm (3.9–4.2 in), slightly larger than the nominate subspecies at 90–98 mm (3.5–3.9 in). Both subspecies can be distinguished from the similar Asian and common house martins by their black chin, black undertail coverts and much squarer tail.

This is an exceptionally fast-flying martin which gives an occasional short chi-i call in flight. It is otherwise a rather quiet bird, but it has a brief three-note breeding song.

== Behaviour ==
=== Breeding ===
The Nepal house martin breeds between March and July, with some variation in timing depending on locality, and usually raises two broods. It normally builds its nest, a deep mud bowl lined with grasses or feathers, under an overhang on a vertical cliff. Very occasionally, buildings may be used as nest sites, and in Sikkim this bird is recorded as nesting under school roofs near the Fambong Lho Wildlife Sanctuary. This martin is a colonial breeder, with colonies sometimes containing hundreds of nests. Some birds may remain at the colonies throughout the year, using the nests as a winter roost. The normal clutch is three or four plain white eggs averaging 18.6 mm × 12.8 mm (0.73 in × 0.50 in) and weighing 1.6 g (0.056 oz). The incubation and fledging times are unknown, but are probably similar to those of the common house martin, which has an incubation period of 14–16 days until the eggs hatch, and a further 22–32 days to fledging. Both sexes build the nest, incubate the eggs and feed the chicks.

=== Feeding ===
The Nepal house martin feeds on insects taken in flight, hunting along ridges or above treetops. The diet is not well known, but includes flies. This bird is gregarious, feeding in flocks often with other aerial predators like the Himalayan swiftlet, or other hirundines such as the barn swallow, striated swallow or common house martin.

=== Predators and parasites ===
Predators of this martin have been little studied, but it was the only bird recorded in a study of the diet of the mainly insectivorous collared falconet. It is parasitised by a flea of the genus Callopsylla.

== Conservation status ==
The Nepal house martin has a large range that does not appear to be contracting, and its numbers appear to be stable, although the population is unknown. Since the range is more than 20,000 square kilometres (7,700 sq mi), and there are more 10,000 mature individuals, in the absence of any large decline in distribution or numbers the species does not appear to meet the criteria to be considered vulnerable, and is currently evaluated as Least Concern by the IUCN. Although often localised due to the requirement for suitable cliff nesting sites, this species is fairly common in Nepal as a whole, and very common in some regions. However, some earlier authors have noted this species as uncommon in Nepal.
