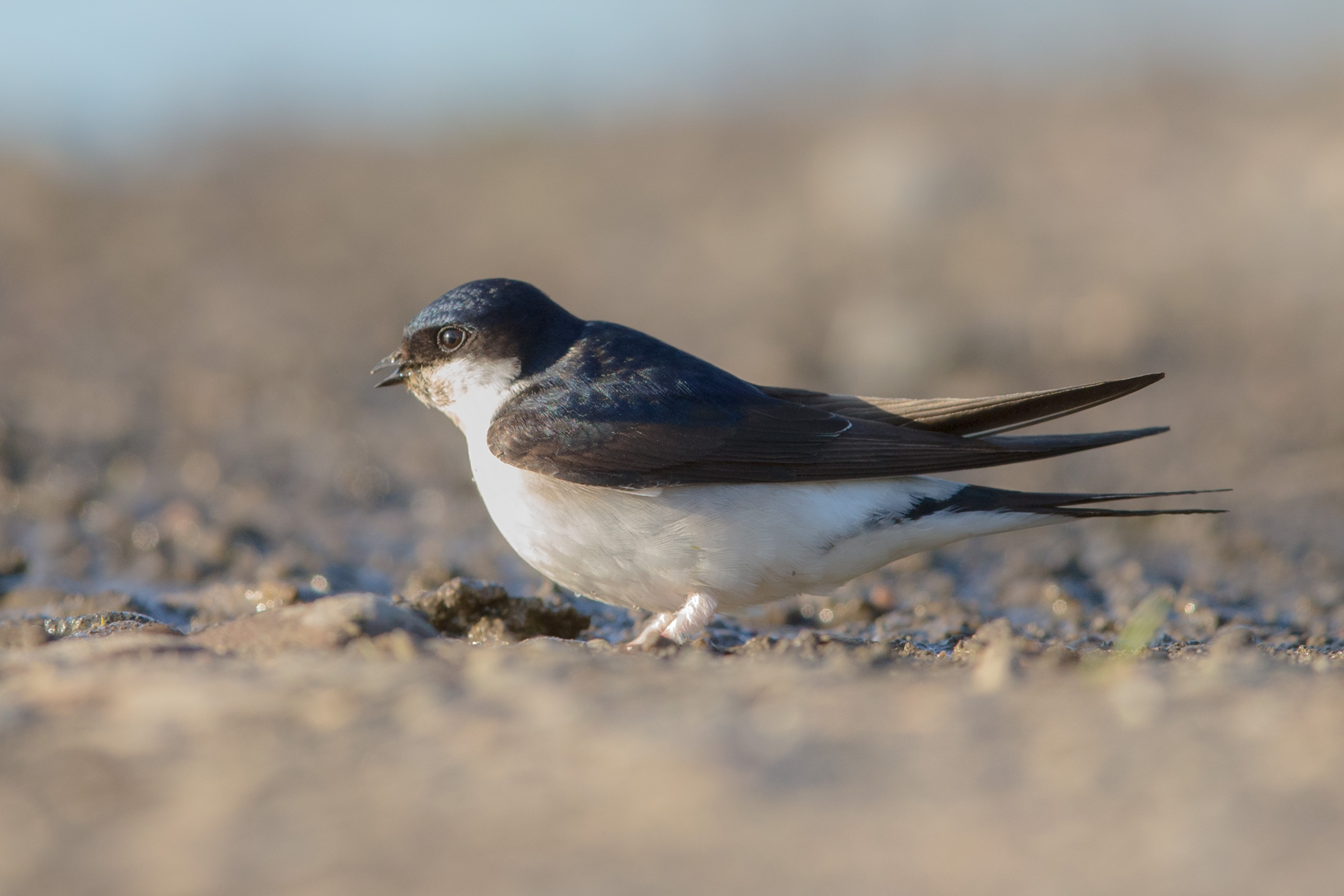
- near Bredstedt, Schleswig-Holstein, Germany

Conservation status
- Least Concern (IUCN 3.1)

Scientific classification
- Kingdom: Animalia
- Phylum: Chordata
- Class: Aves
- Order: Passeriformes
- Family: Hirundinidae
- Genus: Delichon
- Species: D. urbicum

Binomial name
- Delichon urbicum (Linnaeus, 1758)
- Range of D. urbicum Breeding Passage Non-breeding

Synonyms
- Hirundo urbica Linnaeus, 1758; Delichon urbica (Linnaeus); Chelidon urbica (Linnaeus)

Audio
- Song recorded in Ceredigion, Wales

= Western house martin =

Migratory passerine bird of the swallow family

Delichon urbicum

The western house martin (Delichon urbicum), sometimes called the common house martin, northern house martin or, particularly in Europe, just house martin, is a migratory passerine bird of the swallow family which breeds in Europe, north Africa and west-central Asia; and winters in sub-Saharan Africa and southwestern Asia. It feeds on insects which are caught in flight, and it migrates to climates where flying insects are plentiful. It has a blue head and upperparts, white rump and pure white underparts, and is found in both open country and near human habitation. It is similar in appearance to the two other martin species of the genus Delichon, which are both endemic to eastern and southern Asia. It has two accepted subspecies.

Both the scientific and colloquial name of the bird are related to its use of human-made structures. It builds a closed cup nest from mud pellets under eaves or similar locations on buildings usually in colonies.

It is hunted by the Eurasian hobby (Falco subbuteo), and like other birds is affected by internal parasites and external fleas and mites. Its large range and population mean that it is not threatened globally.

== Taxonomy ==
The western house martin was first described by Carl Linnaeus in his landmark 1758 10th edition of Systema Naturae as Hirundo urbica, but was placed in its current genus, Delichon, by Thomas Horsfield and Frederic Moore in 1854. Delichon is an anagram of the ancient Greek term χελιδών (chelīdōn), meaning "swallow", and the species name urbicum (urbica until 2004, due to a misunderstanding of Latin grammar) means "of the town" in Latin.

The genus Delichon is a recent divergence from the barn swallow genus Hirundo, and its three members are similar in appearance with blue upperparts, a contrasting white-rump, and whitish underparts. In the past, the western house martin was sometimes considered to be conspecific with the Asian house martin (D. dasypus), which breeds in the mountains of central and eastern Asia and winters in Southeast Asia, and it also closely resembles the Nepal house martin (D. nipalense), a resident in the mountains of southern Asia. Although the three Delichon martins are similar in appearance, only D. urbicum has a pure white rump and underparts.

The western house martin was formerly considered to be conspecific with the Siberian house martin (Delichon lagopodum) that breeds eastwards of the Yenisei to Kolyma and south to northern Mongolia and northern China; it winters in southern China and Southeast Asia. The two species were split based on morphological and vocal differences. Other races, like meridionalis from around the Mediterranean have been described, but the claimed differences from the nominate race are clinal, and therefore probably invalid.

== Description ==
The adult western house martin is 13 cm (5 in) long, with a wingspan of 26–29 cm (10–11 1/2 in) and a weight averaging 18.3 g (21/32 oz). It is steel-blue above with a white rump, and white underparts, including the underwings; even its short legs have white downy feathering. It has brown eyes and a small black bill, and its toes and exposed parts of the legs are pink. The sexes are similar, but the juvenile bird is sooty black, and some of its wing coverts and quills have white tips and edgings. D. u. lagopodum differs from the nominate race in that its white rump extends much further onto the tail, and the fork of its tail is intermediate in depth between that of D. u. urbicum and that of the Asian house martin.

The white rump and underparts of the western house martin, very noticeable in flight, prevent confusion with other widespread Palaeoarctic swallows such as the barn swallow (Hirundo rustica), sand martin (Riparia riparia) or red-rumped swallow (Cecropis daurica). In Africa, confusion with grey-rumped swallow (Pseudhirundo griseopyga) is possible, but that species has a grey rump, off-white underparts and long, deeply forked tail. The western house martin flies with a wing beat averaging 5.3 beats per second, which is faster than the wing beat of 4.4 beats per second for the barn swallow, but the flight speed of 11 m/s (36 ft/s) is typical for hirundines.

The western house martin is a noisy species, especially at its breeding colonies. The male's song, given throughout the year, is a soft twitter of melodious chirps. The contact call, also given on the wintering grounds, is a hard chirrrp, and the alarm is a shrill tseep.

== Distribution and habitat ==
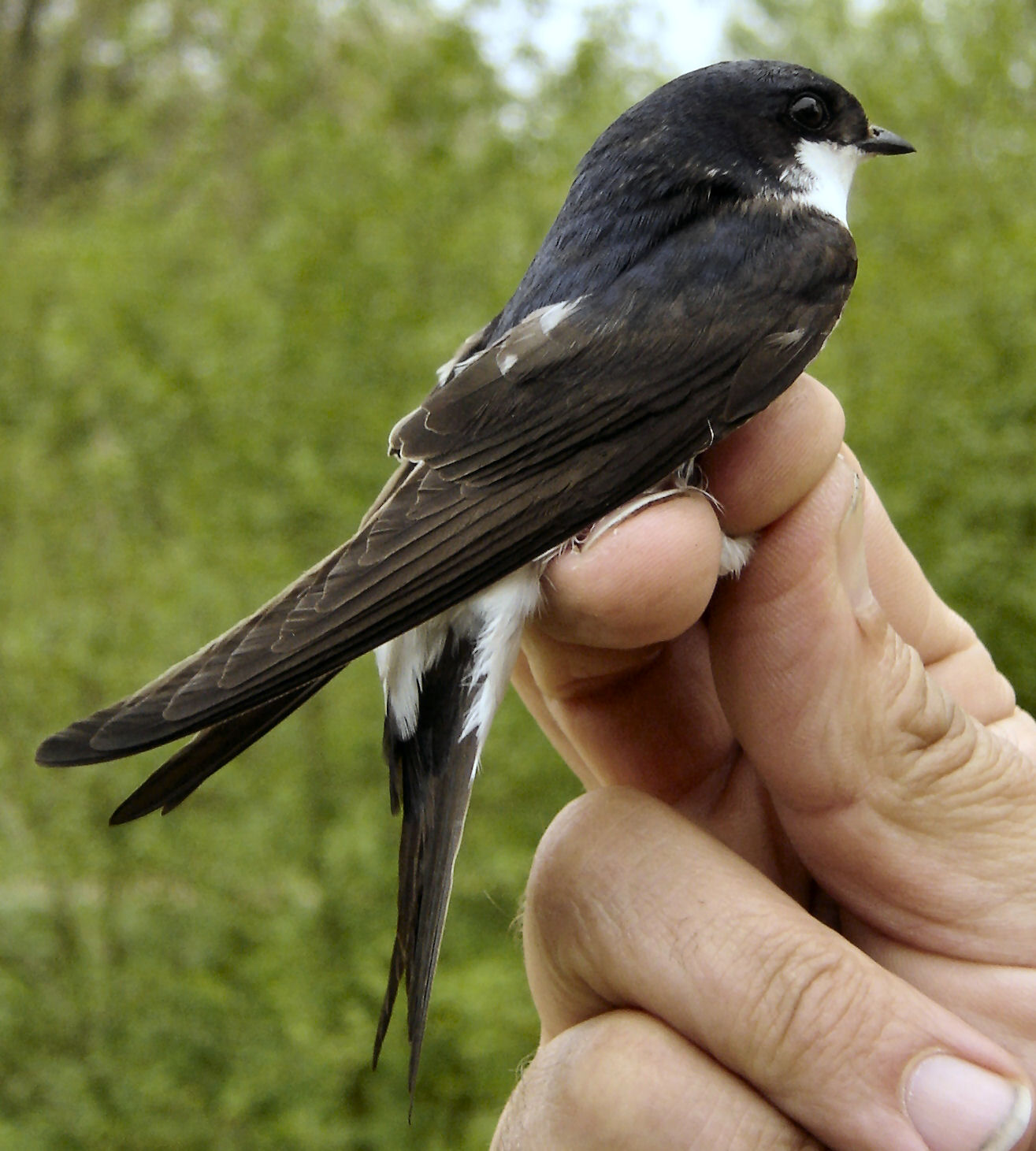
At an official bird ringing station

The western house martin breeds across temperate Eurosiberia east to central Mongolia and the Yenisei River, and in Morocco, Tunisia and northern Algeria, and migrates on a broad front to winter in sub-Saharan Africa.

The preferred habitat of the western house martin is open country with low vegetation, such as pasture, meadows and farmland, and preferably near water, although it is also found in mountains up to at least 2,200 m (7,200 ft) elevation. It is much more urban than the barn swallow, and will nest even in city centres if the air is clean enough. It is more likely to be found near trees than other Eurasian swallows, since they provide insect food and also roosting sites. This species does not normally use the reed-bed roosts favoured by migrating barn swallows.

It uses similar open habitats on the wintering grounds, but the western house martin is less conspicuous than wintering barn swallows, tending to fly higher and be more nomadic. In the tropical parts of its wintering range, like East Africa, it appears to be mainly found in the higher areas.

The western house martin is a migrant which moves on a broad front (i.e., European birds are not funnelled through the short sea crossings used by large soaring birds, but cross the Mediterranean and Sahara). While migrating they feed in the air on insects, and they usually travel in daylight. Migration brings its own hazards; in 1974, several hundred thousand birds of this species were found dead or dying in the Swiss Alps and surrounding areas, caught by heavy snowfall and low temperatures. Adult survival on autumn migration depends mainly on temperature, with precipitation another major factor, but for juveniles low temperatures during the breeding season are more critical. It is anticipated that since extreme weather is predicted to become more frequent with climate change, future survival rates will depend more on adverse weather conditions than at present.

The western house martin returns to the breeding grounds a few days after the first barn swallows; and like that species, particularly when the weather is poor, it seldom goes straight to the nesting sites, but hunts for food over large fresh water bodies. There are records of migrant house martins staying to breed in Namibia and South Africa instead of returning north. As would be expected for a long-distance migrant, it has occurred as a vagrant eastwards to Alaska and west to Newfoundland, Bermuda and the Azores. There is also a record of a western house martin in Colombia.

== Behaviour ==
=== Breeding ===
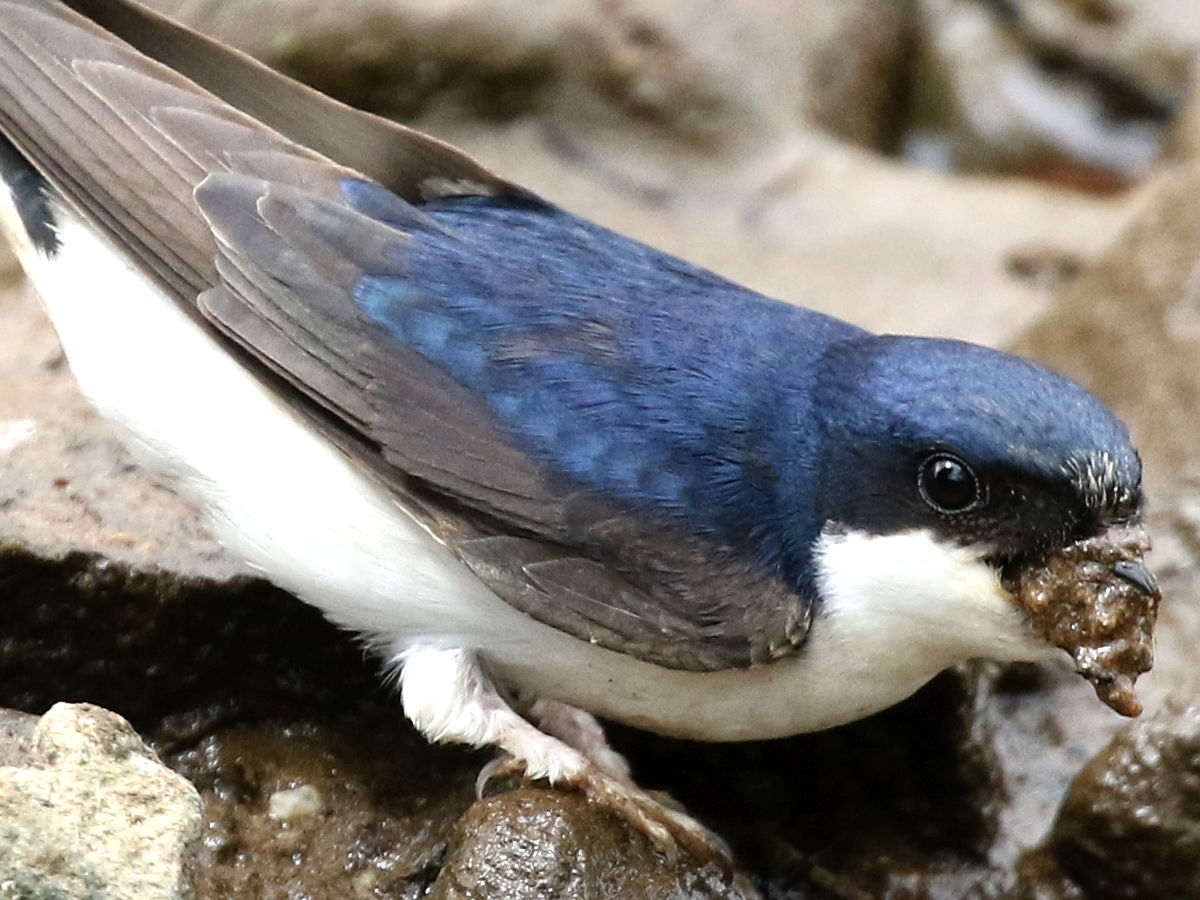
Gathering mud Verkhniye Mandrogi, Russia

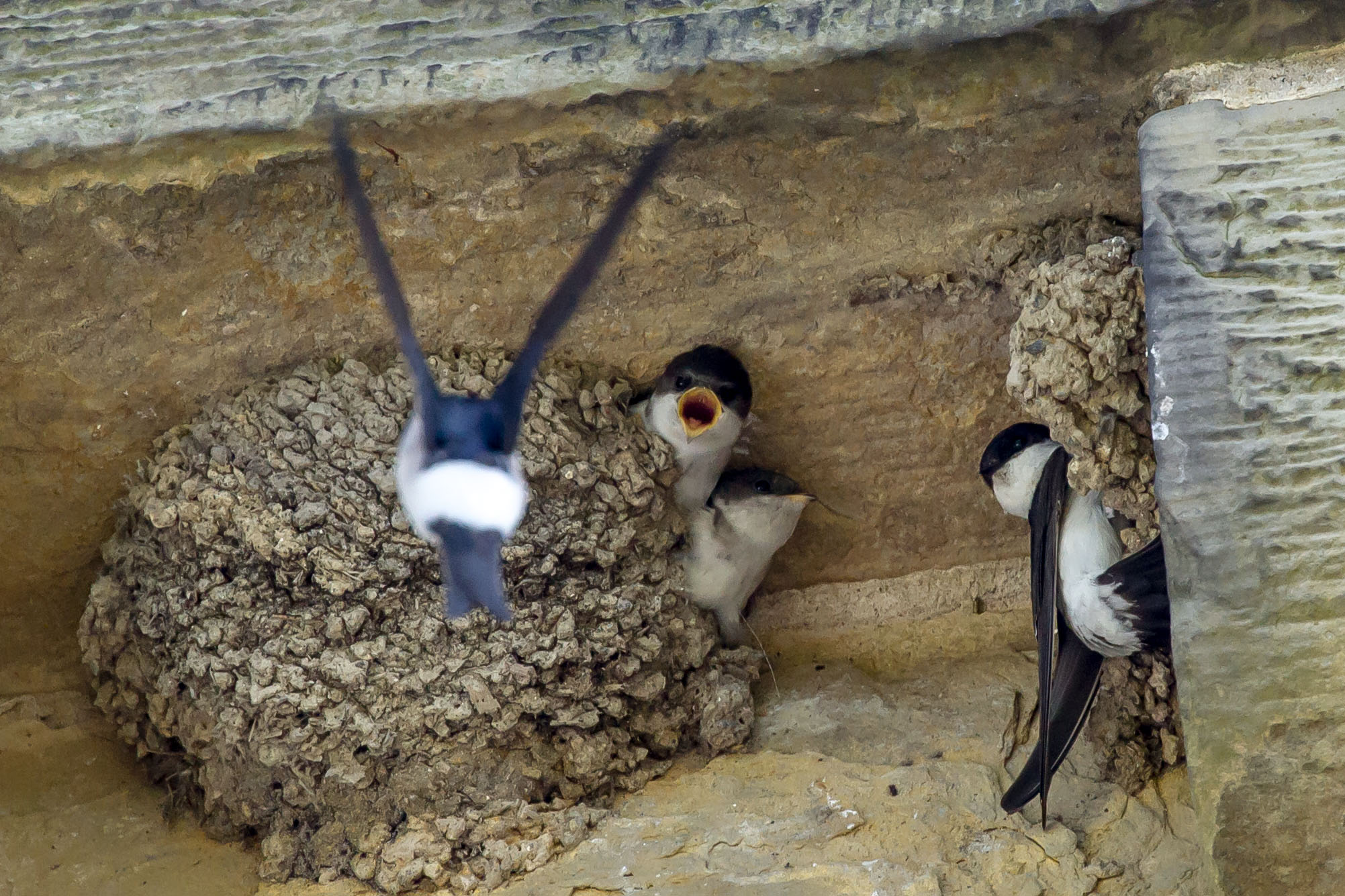
A mother flying back to a full nest in the eaves of a house in Kent, England

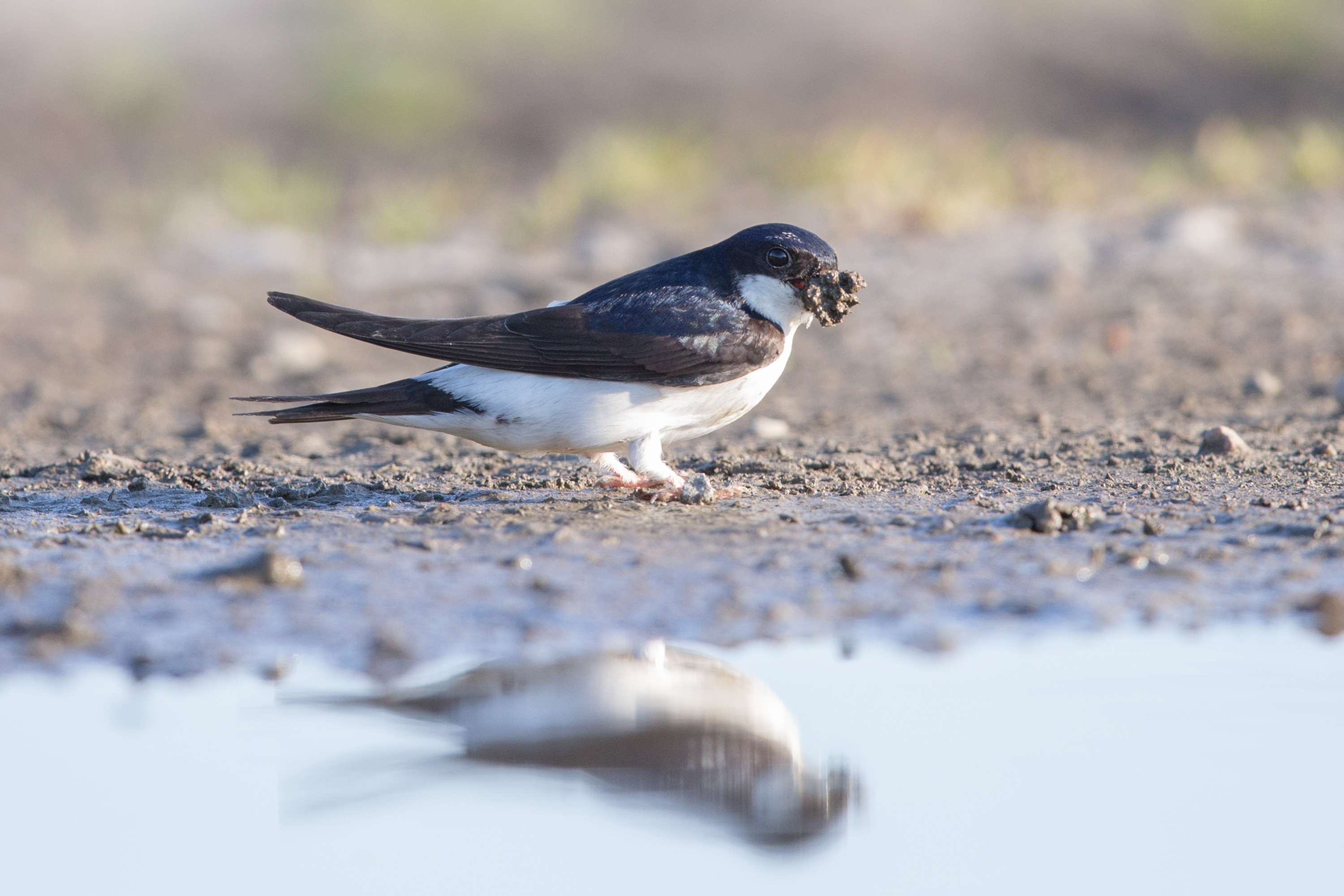
Collecting mud

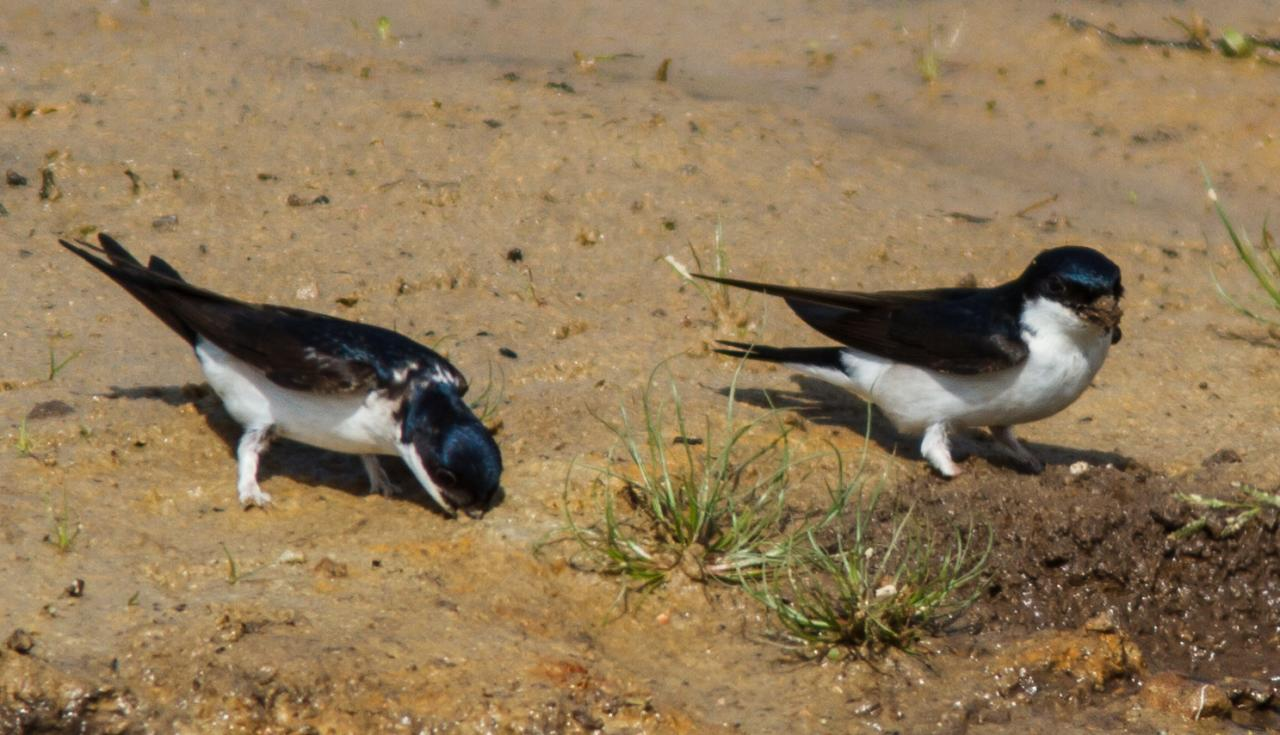
Collecting mud for nests in Denmark

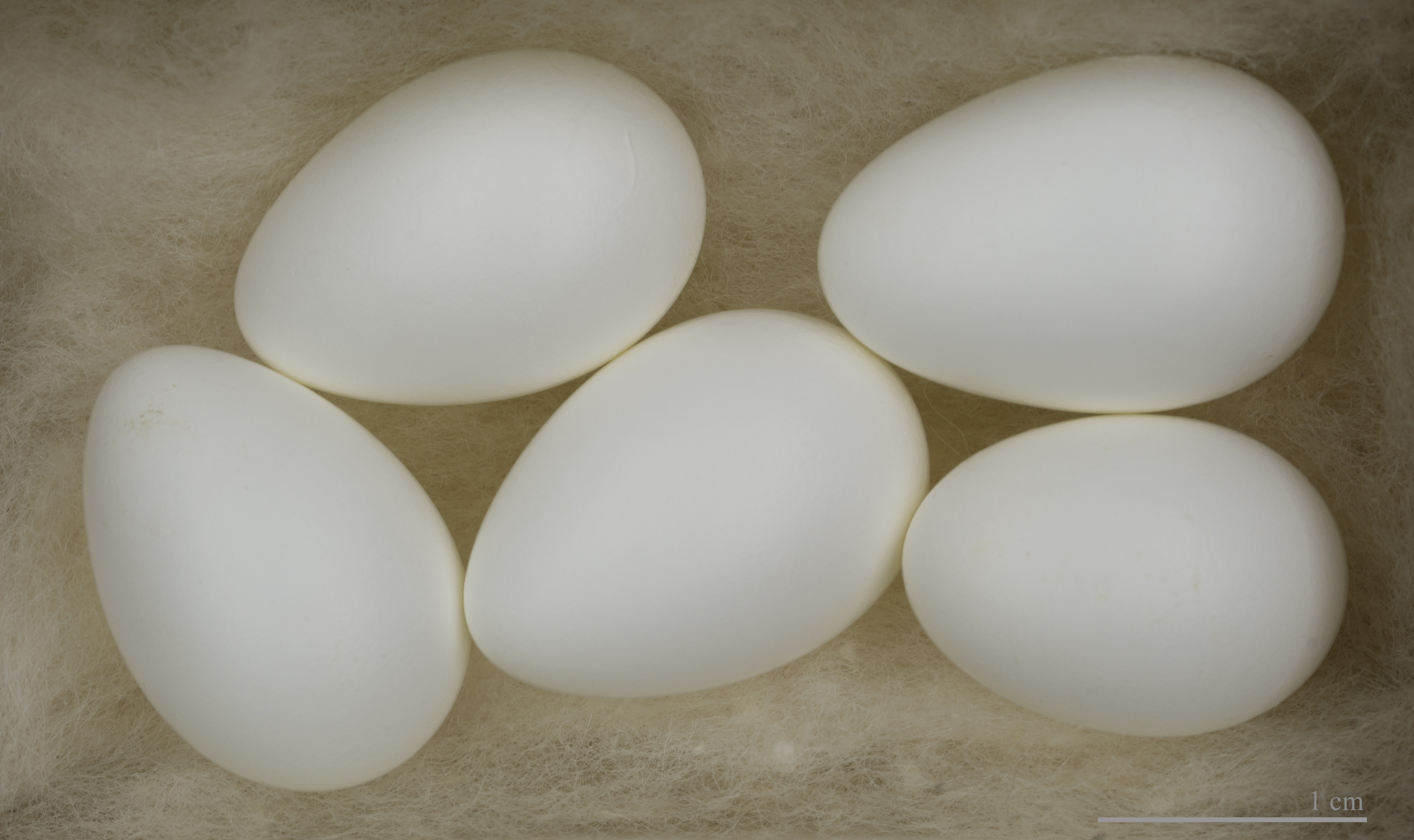
Delichon urbicum – MHNT

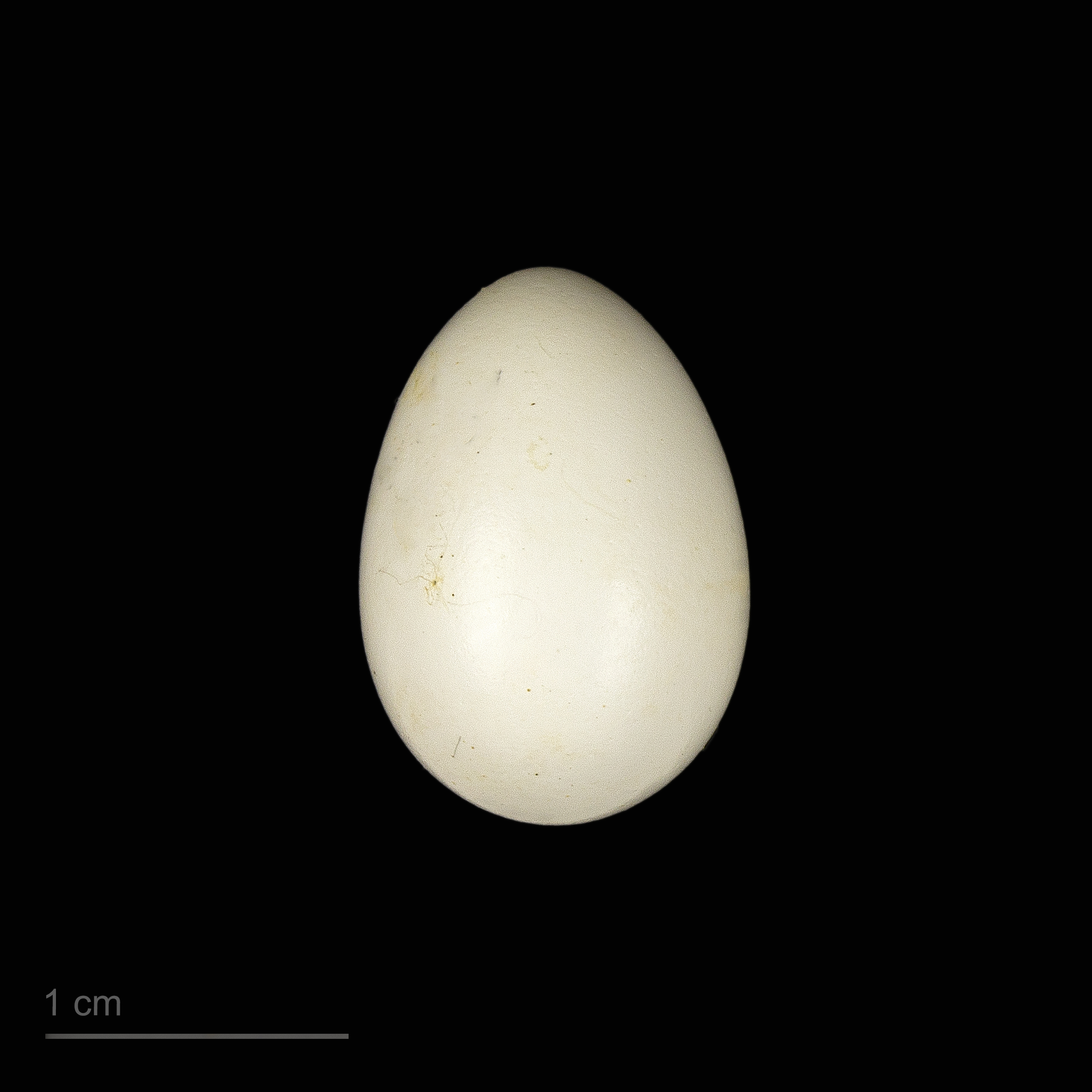
Delichon urbicum meridionale - Algeria- MHNT

The western house martin was originally a cliff and cave nester, and some cliff-nesting colonies still exist, with the nests built below an overhanging rock. It now largely uses human structures such as bridges and houses. Unlike the barn swallow, it uses the outside of inhabited buildings, rather than the inside of barns or stables. The nests are built at the junction of a vertical surface and an overhang, such as on house eaves, so that they may be strengthened by attachment to both planes.

Breeding birds return to Europe between April and May, and nest building starts between late March in North Africa and mid-June in Lapland. The nest is a neat closed convex cup fixed below a suitable ledge, with a narrow opening at the top. It is constructed by both sexes with mud pellets collected in their beaks, and lined with grasses, hair or other soft materials. The mud, added in successive layers, is collected from ponds, streams or puddles. House sparrows frequently attempt to take over the nest during construction, with the house martins rebuilding elsewhere if they are successful. The entrance at the top of the cup is so small once it is complete that sparrows cannot take over the nest.

The western house martin tends to breed colonially, and nests may be built in contact with each other. A colony size of less than 10 nests is typical, but there are records of colonies with thousands of nests. Four or five white eggs are usually laid, which average 1.9 cm × 1.33 cm (3/4 in × 17/32 in) in size, and weigh 1.7 g (1/16 oz). The female does most of the incubation, which normally lasts 14–16 days. The newly hatched chicks are altricial, and after a further 22–32 days, depending on weather, the chicks leave the nest. The fledged young stay with, and are fed by, the parents for about a week after leaving the nest. Occasionally, first-year birds from the first brood will assist in feeding the second brood.

There are normally two broods each year, the nest being reused for the second brood, and repaired and used again in subsequent years. Hatching success is 90%, and fledging survival 60–80%. Third broods are not uncommon, though late nestlings are often left to starve. The average annual mortality for adults nesting in the Western Palaearctic is 40–60%, with most deaths outside the breeding season. A study of British breeders gave an average adult survival rate of just under 40%, but ranging from 25% to 70%. Rainfall in the African wintering grounds is a major factor in adult survival, although wet weather in the breeding areas has very little effect. Although individuals aged 10 and 14 years have been recorded, most survive less than five years. For weeks after leaving the nest the young congregate in ever-increasing flocks which, as the season advances, may be seen gathering in trees or on housetops, or on the wires with swallows. By the end of October, most martins have left their breeding areas in western and central Europe, though late birds in November and December are not uncommon, and further south migration finishes later anyway.

Once established, pairs remain together to breed for life; however, extra-pair copulations are common, making this species genetically polygamous, despite being socially monogamous. A Scottish study showed that 15% of nestlings were not related to their putative fathers, and 32% of broods contained at least one extra-pair chick. Extra-pair males, usually from nests where laying had already taken place, were often seen to enter other nests. The paired male initially ensured that his female spent little time alone at the nest, and accompanied her on flights, but the mate-guarding slackened after egg laying began, so the youngest nestling was the most likely to have a different father.

The western house martin has been regularly recorded as hybridising with the barn swallow, this being one of the most common passerine interspecific crosses. The frequency of this hybrid has led to suggestions that Delichon is not sufficiently separated genetically from Hirundo to be considered a separate genus.

=== Diet ===
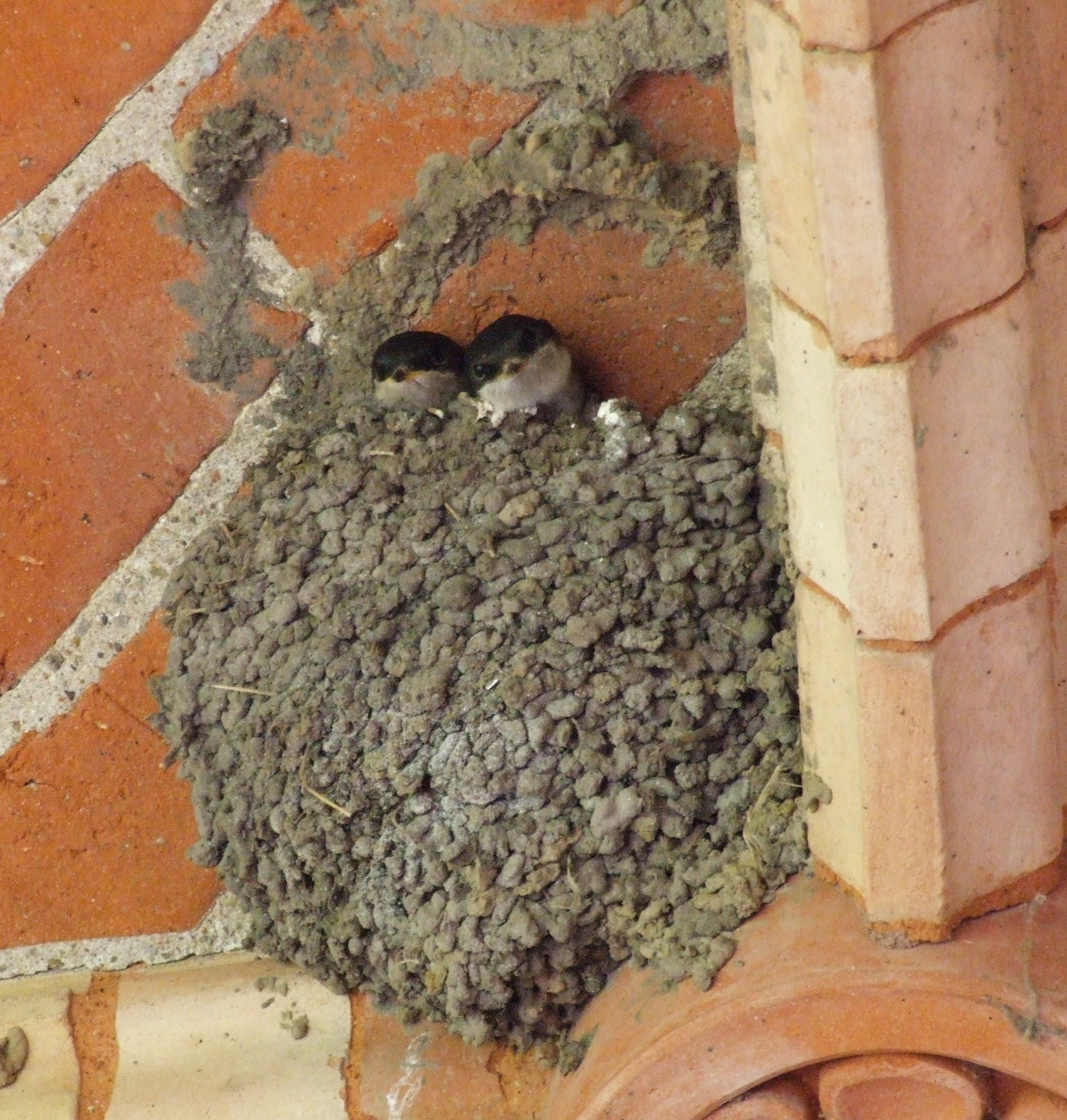
Nest with chicks

The western house martin is similar in habits to other aerial insectivores, including other swallows and martins and the unrelated swifts, and catches insects in flight. In the breeding areas, flies and aphids make up much of the diet, and in Europe, the house martin takes a larger proportion of aphids and small flies than the barn swallow. As with that species, hymenopterans, especially flying ants, are important food items in the wintering area.

This species hunts at an average height of 21 m (69 ft) during the breeding season, but lower in wet conditions. The hunting grounds are typically within 450 m (1,480 ft) of the nest, with a preference for open ground or water, the latter especially in poor weather, but the martins will also follow the plough or large animals to catch disturbed insects. On the wintering grounds, hunting takes place at a greater height of over 50 m (160 ft).

=== Predators and parasites ===
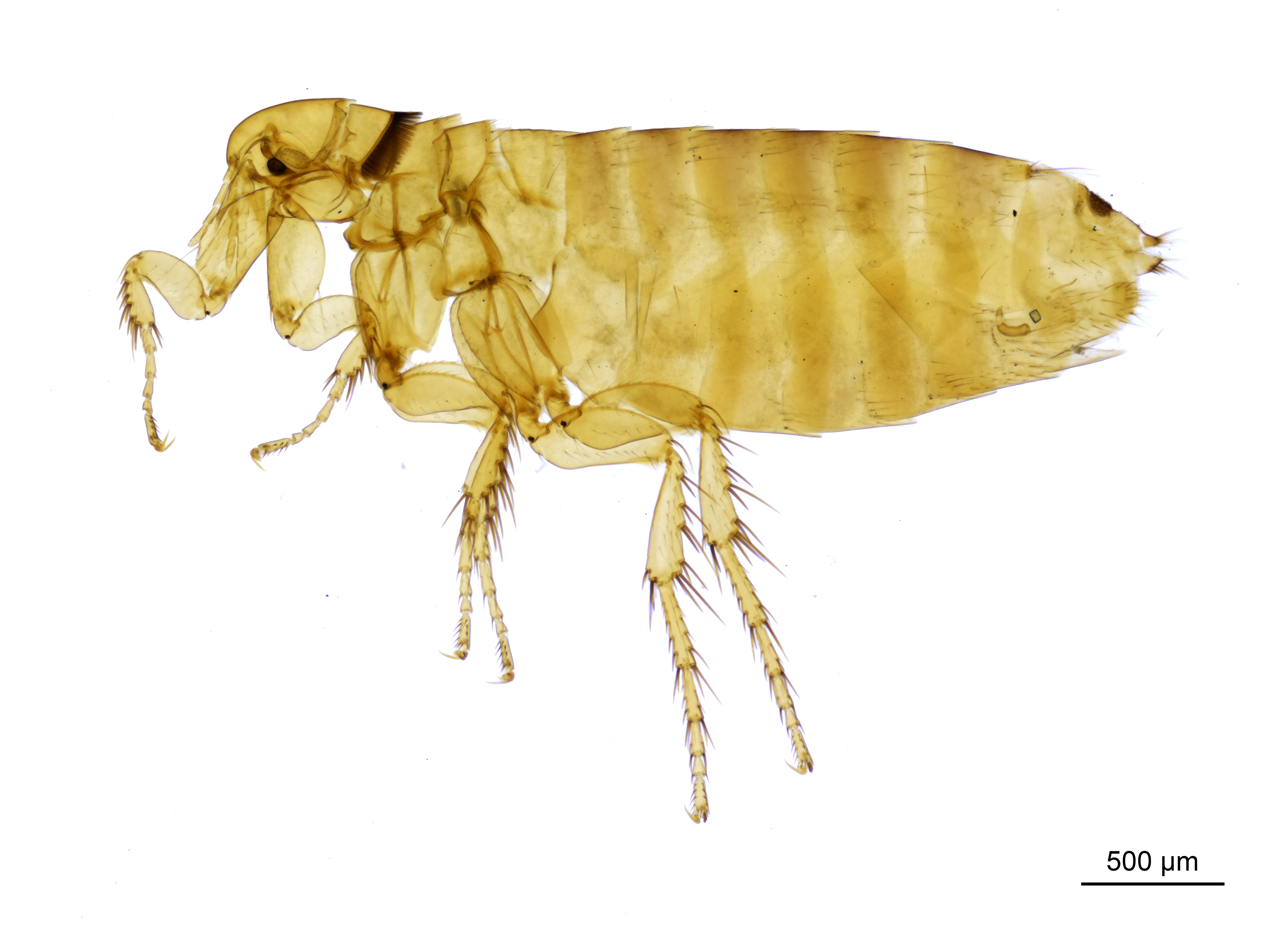
A female house martin flea

Although the western house martin is hunted by the hobby (Falco subbuteo), its aerial skills enable it to evade most predators.

It is parasitised externally by fleas and mites, including the "house martin flea", Ceratophyllus hirundinis, and internally by endoparasites such as Haemoproteus prognei (avian malaria), which are transmitted by blood-sucking insects including mosquitoes. A Polish study showed that nests typically contained more than 29 specimens of ectoparasite, with C. hirundinis and Oeciacus hirundinis the most abundant.

== Conservation status ==
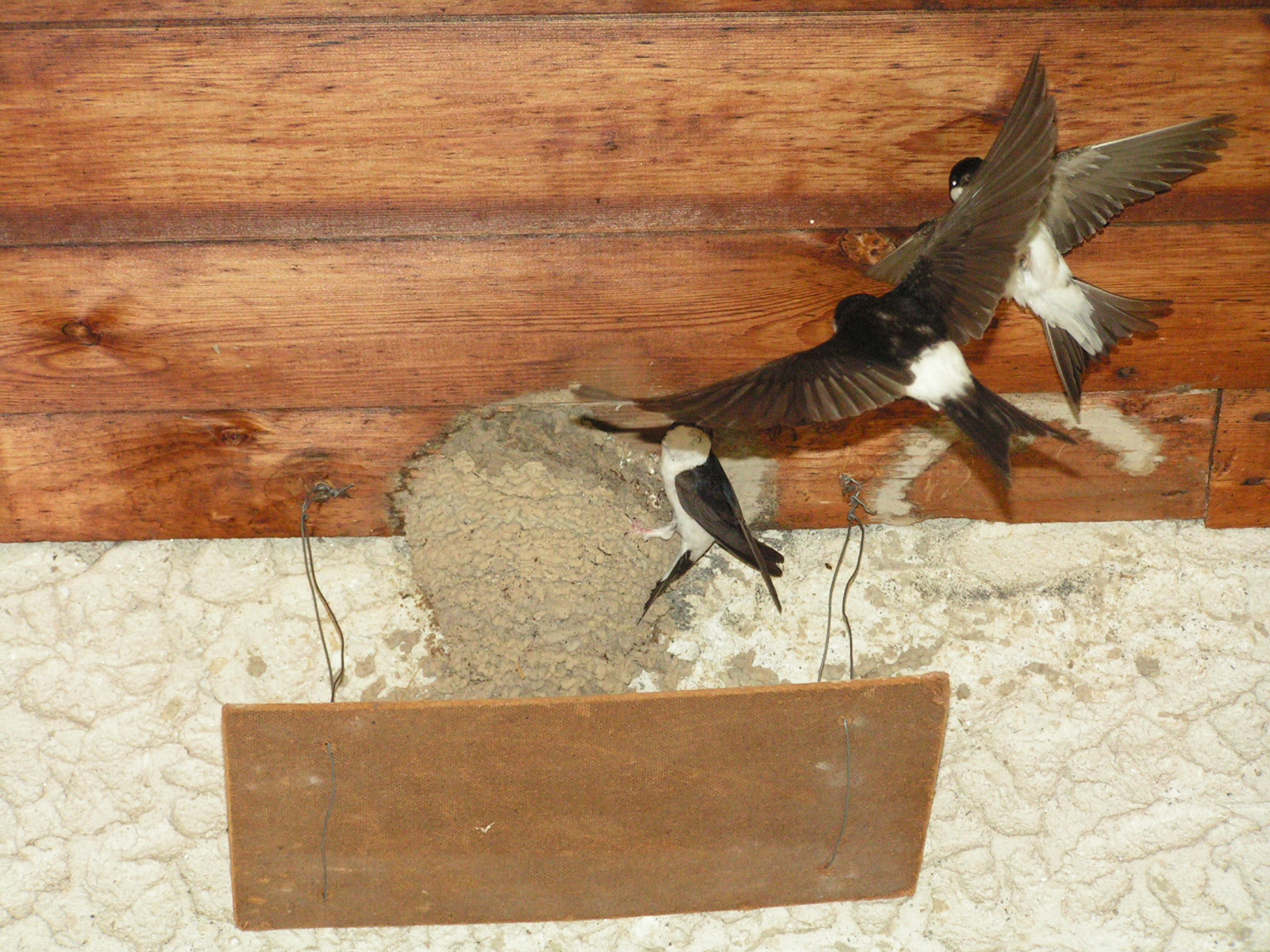
Nest with board to prevent fouling below

The western house martin has a large range, with an estimated global extent of 30,800,000 km^{2} (11,900,000 sq mi). Its European population is estimated to be 22–47 million individuals. Global population trends have not been quantified, although there is evidence of population fluctuations. For these reasons, the species is evaluated as least concern on the IUCN Red List, and has no special status under the Convention on International Trade in Endangered Species of Wild Fauna and Flora (CITES) which regulates international trade in specimens of wild animals and plants. In Europe and Britain, however, population numbers indicate a declining trend, and leading conservation groups in Britain have updated the conservations status to amber indicating medium conservation concern there.

This is a species which has greatly benefited historically from forest clearance creating the open habitats it prefers, and from human habitation which has given it an abundance of safe nest sites. However, populations can fluctuate locally for a number of reasons. New housing has created more nest sites, and clean-air legislation has enabled breeding in the centre of major cities like London. The population of house martins in Sheffield, central UK, has been estimated at 12,353 individuals. Conversely, poor weather, poisoning by agricultural pesticides, lack of mud for nest building and competition with house sparrows can reduce numbers. Widespread declines in western house martin numbers have been reported from central and northern Europe since 1970. As an attractive bird which feeds on flying insects, the house martin has usually been tolerated by humans when it shares their buildings for nesting, although the accumulation of droppings below breeding birds can be a nuisance leading to some destruction of nests.

== In literature and culture ==
Coat of arms of Richard II featuring five martlets

This species lacks the wealth of literary references associated with its relative, the barn swallow, although it is possible that some of the older mentions for that bird might equally well refer to the house martin. William Shakespeare was clearly describing the house martin when Banquo brings the nests and birds to the attention of Duncan at Macbeth's castle, Inverness:

"This guest of summer,

The temple-haunting martlet, does approve
By his loved mansionry that the heaven's breath
Smells wooingly here. No jutty, frieze,
Buttress, nor coign of vantage, but this bird
Hath made his pendant bed and procreant cradle;
Where they most breed and haunt, I have observed

The air is delicate." (Macbeth, Act I, scene VI).

There are old legends, with no basis in fact, that house martins would wall-up house sparrows by closing the entrance of the mud nest with the intruder inside, or that they would gather en masse to kill a sparrow.

The martlet, often believed to refer to the house martin, or possibly a swallow, was a heraldic bird with short tufts of feathers in the place of legs. It was the cadency mark of the fourth son of a noble family, and features in many coats of arms, including the Plantagenets. The lack of feet signified its inability to land, which explained its link to a younger son, also landless. It also represented swiftness.
