= David Shelton =

David Shelton may refer to:

- David Shelton (sailor), see List of World Championships medalists in sailing (centreboard classes)
- David Shelton, namesake of Shelton, Washington
- David Shelton (Canadian football), see 81st Grey Cup
- Dave Shelton, soccer player

== See also ==
- David Shelton House, on National Register of Historic Places listings in Talbot County, Georgia
- David Sheldon (disambiguation)
