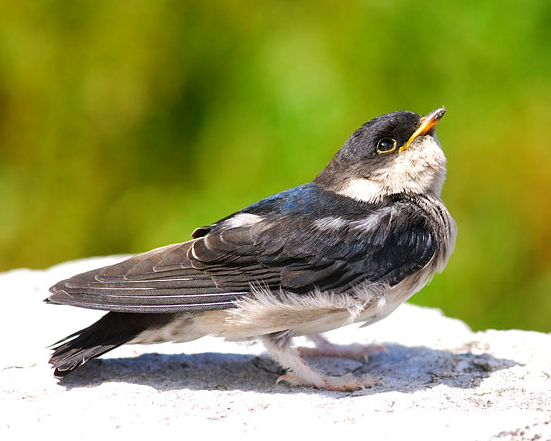
- In Taiwan

Conservation status
- Least Concern (IUCN 3.1)

Scientific classification
- Kingdom: Animalia
- Phylum: Chordata
- Class: Aves
- Order: Passeriformes
- Family: Hirundinidae
- Genus: Delichon
- Species: D. dasypus

Binomial name
- Delichon dasypus (Bonaparte, 1850)
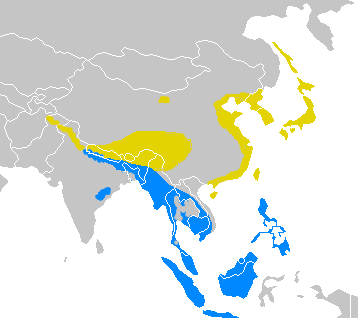
- Distribution of Asian house martin Breeding Non-breeding

= Asian house martin =

Species of bird

The Asian house martin (Delichon dasypus) is a migratory passerine bird of the swallow family Hirundinidae. It has mainly blue-black upperparts, other than its white rump, and has pale grey underparts. Its three subspecies breed in the Himalayas and in central and eastern Asia, and spend the winter lower in the mountains or in Southeast Asia. This species is locally abundant and is expanding northward in Siberia, so there are no concerns about its conservation status.

This martin breeds in colonies, building mud nests under an overhang on a vertical cliff or the wall of a building. Both sexes build the nest, incubate the three or four white eggs and feed the chicks. The Asian house martin feeds on small insects taken in flight, usually caught high in the air. The presence of terrestrial springtails and Lepidoptera larvae in its diet indicates that food is sometimes picked from the ground.

== Taxonomy ==
The Asian house martin was first formally described from a bird collected in Borneo by French naturalist and ornithologist Charles Lucien Bonaparte in 1850 as Chelidon dasypus, shortly before it was moved to the new genus Delichon by British entomologist Frederic Moore and American naturalist Thomas Horsfield in 1854. Delichon is an anagram of the Ancient Greek term χελιδών (chelīdōn), meaning "swallow", and dasypus is from Greek δασύπους "rough-legged". This martin's closest relatives are the two other members of the genus Delichon, the Nepal house martin and the common house martin. There are three subspecies:

- D. d. dasypus, the nominate subspecies described by Bonaparte, which breeds in eastern Russia and nearby islands
- D. d. cashmeriensis, the Himalayan and central Asian form described by English ornithologist John Gould in 1858 from a Kashmiri specimen obtained by Andrew Leith Adams
- D. d. nigrimentalis, the form which is found in the south east of the breeding range, was described by German ornithologist Ernst Hartert in 1910 from a specimen taken in Fujian, southeast China.

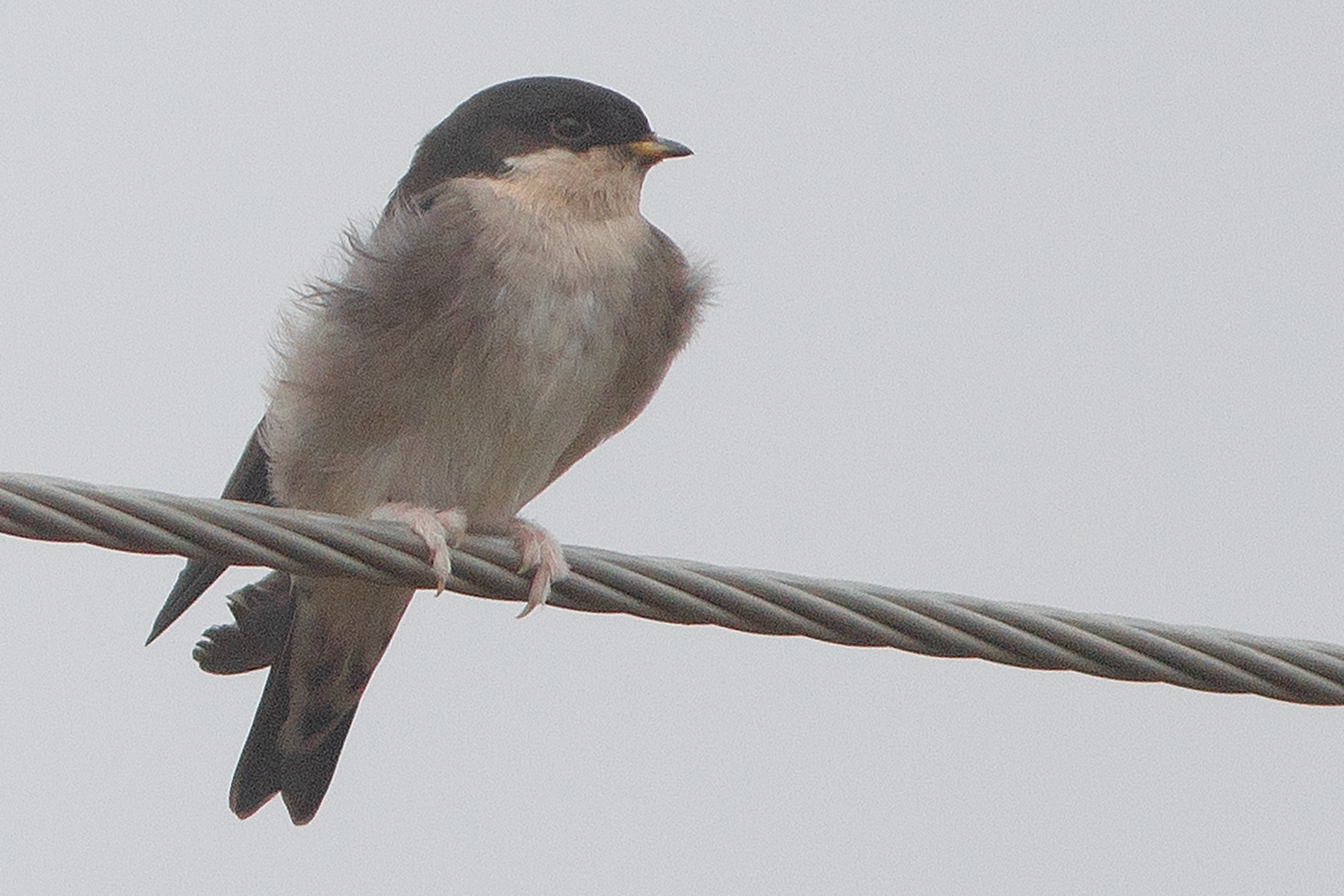
D. d. cashmeriensis from Sikkim, India.

== Description ==
The adult Asian house martin of the nominate subspecies is 12 cm (4.7 in) long, dark steel blue above with a contrasting white rump, grey-washed white underparts, and a slightly forked tail. The tail and upperwings are brownish-black, and the underwings are grey-brown. The legs and feet are brownish-pink and covered with white feathers, the eyes are brown, and the bill is black. There are few differences in appearance between the sexes, although the male is somewhat whiter below than the female, especially in fresh plumage. The juvenile bird is less glossy and has dark brown upperparts, sometimes with a brownish wash to the rump, and grey-white underparts.

D. d. cashmiriensis has brighter blue upperparts and a whiter rump than the slightly larger nominate race. The third, smallest, race is D. d. nigrimentalis. All three subspecies can be distinguished from the similar Nepal house martin by the latter species' black chin, black undertail coverts and much squarer tail. The Asian house martin is more similar to the common house martin, but is darker underneath and has a less deeply forked tail. Confusion is most likely between adult male Asian house martins, which have paler underparts, and the eastern race of common house martin, D. urbicum lagopodum which has a less forked tail than the western subspecies, although it still shows a more pronounced fork than the Asian house martin.

This species' song is a rippling metallic trill or sibilant twitter, and its call is a dry metallic cheep, often with two or three syllables. It is similar to that of the common house martin, but more rasping.

== Distribution and habitat ==
The nominate subspecies of the Asian house martin, D. d. dasypus, breeds in the southeast of Russia, the Kuril Islands, Japan and sometimes Korea. It migrates through eastern China to winter in the Malay Peninsula, Borneo, the Philippines, Java and Sumatra; a few birds remain around hot springs in Japan. D. d. cashmeriensis breeds in the Himalayas from Afghanistan east to Sikkim and northwards into Tibet and western and central China. It is found between 1,500–5,000 m (4,900–16,400 ft) altitude, although mainly in the 2,400–4,000 m (7,900–13,100 ft) range. This martin is a short-range migrant, mainly wintering at lower altitudes in the foothills of the Himalayas, but with some birds on the plains of northeastern India and northeastern and southeastern Bangladesh, and smaller numbers further afield in Myanmar and northern Thailand. The third race, D. d. nigrimentalis, breeds in southeastern China and southern Siberia. Its wintering grounds are unknown, but birds in Taiwan just move to lower altitudes in winter. Non-breeding Asian house martins have been recorded as far west as the United Arab Emirates. The range of D. d. cashmeriensis overlaps with that of the Nepal house martin, although they breed at somewhat different altitudes. The height separation and the small differences in appearance seem sufficient to prevent interbreeding.

The preferred habitat of the Asian house martin is valleys and gorges in mountainous areas or coastal cliffs, where natural caves or crevices provide nest sites. It will also breed on large man-made sites like temples, hotels or power stations. This martin tends to move to lower altitude open or hilly country in its wintering areas, although it has been recorded at up to 2,565 m (8,415 ft) in Thailand.

== Behaviour ==
=== Breeding ===
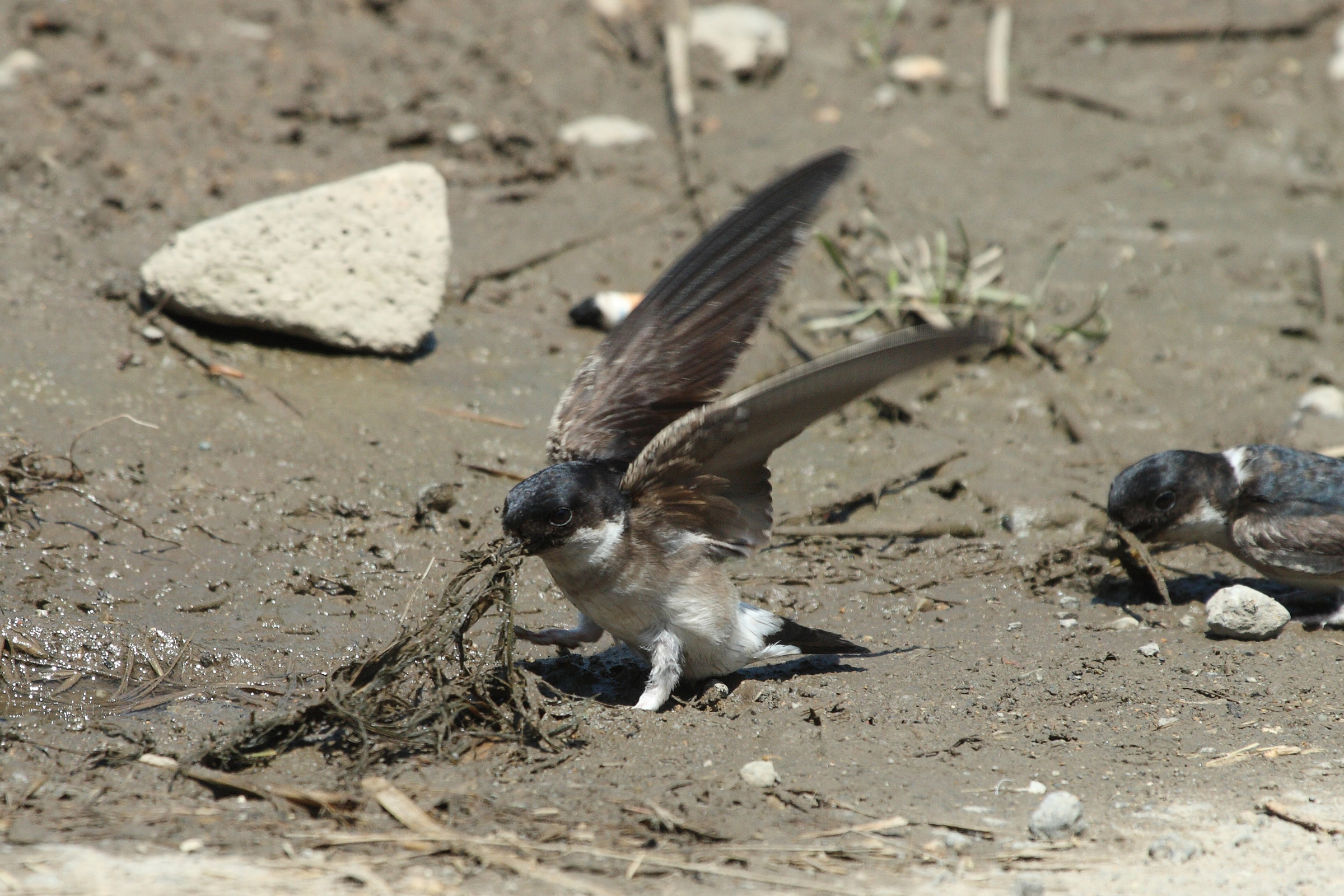
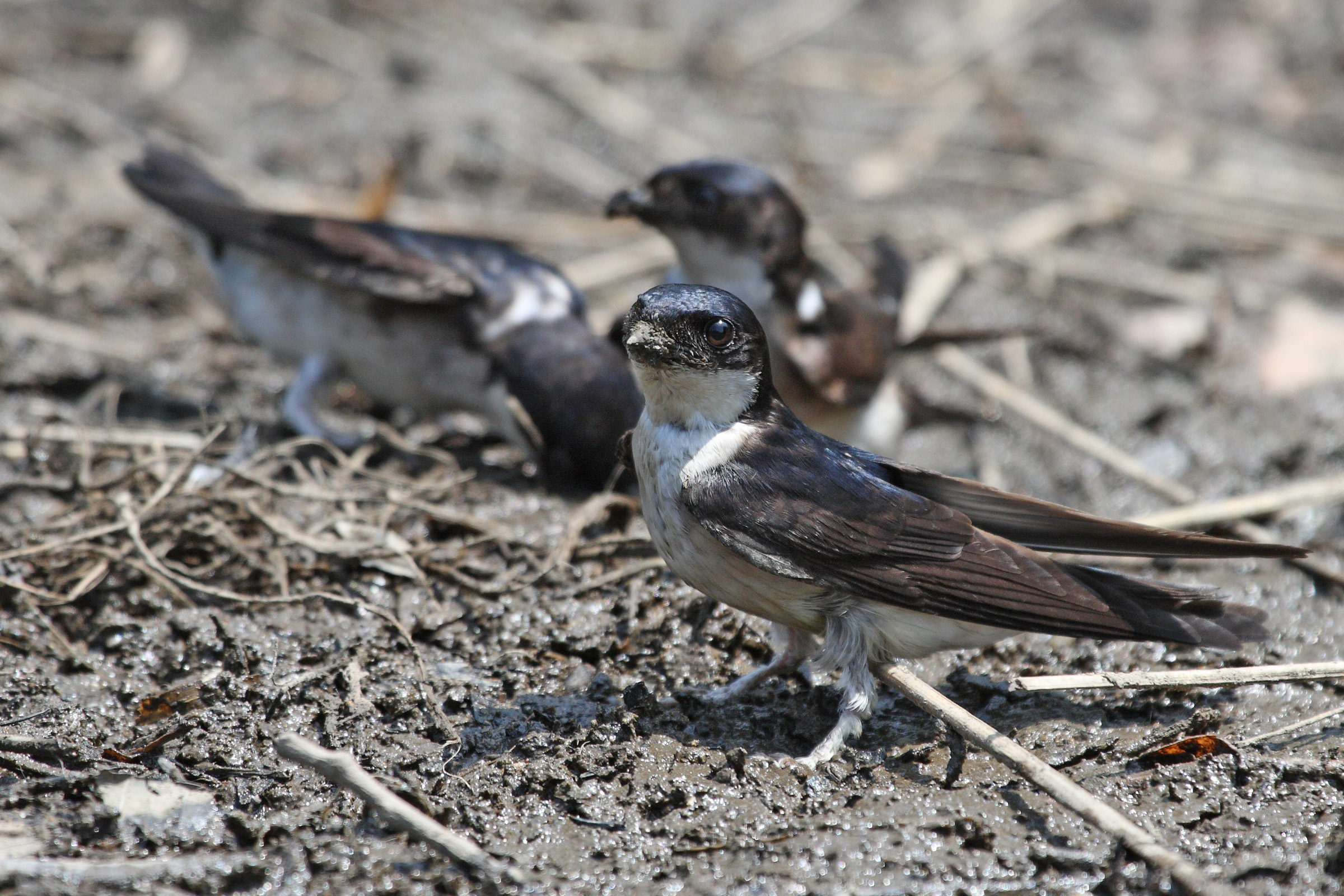
Birds collecting nest material in Hokkaido, Japan. On the left a bird is pulling up muddy grass

The Asian house martin is a cliff nester, breeding in colonies sited under an overhang on a vertical cliff, usually with the nests not touching. It also frequently nests on large buildings such as temples and bridges, but not to the same extent as the common house martin. The nest is a deep mud cone lined with grasses or feathers. Unlike its relatives, the Asian house martin frequently does not complete the enclosure of its nest, leaving it open instead like a deeper version of a barn swallow nest. A Russian study found half the nests in its Baikal research area to be of the open type, and the Himalayan subspecies D. d. cashmiriensis has also been recorded as building a shallow cup nest.

The normal clutch is three or four (occasionally up to six) plain white eggs averaging 20.2 mm × 14.1 mm (0.80 in × 0.56 in) and weighing 2.1 g (0.074 oz). The incubation and fledging times are unknown, but are probably similar to those of the common house martin, which has an incubation period of 14 to 16 days until the eggs hatch, and a further 22 to 32 days to fledging. Both sexes build the nest, incubate the eggs and feed the chicks.

=== Feeding ===
This martin feeds on insects taken in flight. As with its relatives it tends to feed high in the air, taking mostly small flies, aphids and Hymenoptera such as winged ants. A wide range of other insects are caught, including Lepidoptera, beetles and lacewings. The presence in the diet of terrestrial springtails and Lepidoptera larvae indicates that food is sometimes picked from the ground.

=== Predators and parasites ===
Birds often carry parasites, both external lice and fleas, and internal blood parasites. The Asian house martin is a host of the house martin flea Ceratophyllus hirundinis, and has recently been shown to carry signs of avian malaria. The predators of this martin appear to be little studied, but are presumably similar to those of the common house martin, namely fast-flying falcons such as the Oriental hobby, which can chase down their prey in flight.

== Conservation status ==
The Asian house martin has a large range that does not appear to be contracting, and its numbers appear to be stable, although the total population is unknown. Since the range is more than 20,000 square kilometres (7,700 sq mi), and there are more than 10,000 mature individuals, in the absence of any large decline in distribution or numbers the species does not appear to meet the criteria to be considered vulnerable, and is currently evaluated as Least Concern by the IUCN. This species is locally abundant and appears to be expanding its range northwards in southern Siberia.
