= Shell Lake =

Shell Lake may refer to several places:

== Canada ==
- Shell Lake, Saskatchewan, a community in Saskatchewan
  - Shell Lake murders
- Big Shell Lake, a lake in Saskatchewan
- Shell Lake (Saskatchewan), a lake in Saskatchewan
- Rural Municipality of Shell Lake No. 495
- Inuvik/Shell Lake Water Aerodrome

== United States ==
- Shell Lake, Wisconsin
  - Shell Lake Municipal Airport
- Shell Lake Township, Minnesota
- Shell Lake National Wildlife Refuge, a protected area in North Dakota

=== US Lakes ===
- Shell Lake (Becker County, Minnesota)
- Shell Lake (Wisconsin)
