= Governor Sheldon =

Governor Sheldon may refer to:

- Charles H. Sheldon (1840–1898), 2nd Governor of South Dakota
- George L. Sheldon (1870–1960), 14th Governor of Nebraska
- Lionel Allen Sheldon (1828–1917), Governor of New Mexico Territory from 1881 to 1885
