= David Sheldon =

David Sheldon may refer to:

- David Sheldon (wrestler) (1953–2007), American professional wrestler, better known by his ring name Angel of Death
- David Newton Sheldon (1807–1889), president of Colby College, Maine, United States
- David Sheldon, character in Adventure
- David Sheldon (director) of Peopletoys
- Mac Lethal (David McCleary Sheldon, born 1981), rapper

== See also ==
- David Shelton (disambiguation)
