= Frederick H. Sheldon =

American ornithologist

Frederick Halsey "Fred" Sheldon (born 14 December 1951) is an American ornithologist.

== Early years ==
Fred Sheldon was born of American parents in Austria and raised in New Jersey. In high school, he attended Montclair Academy (now Montclair Kimberley Academy) and graduated in 1970. Then he attended Yale University, where he received a BS degree in Geology & Geophysics (1974), an MS in Biology (1981), and a PhD in Biology (1986). His dissertation research was on the molecular phylogenetics and evolution of herons, and his PhD advisor was Charles G. Sibley. In 1986, he was awarded Yale's John Spangler Nicholas Prize for the outstanding doctoral thesis in Biological Sciences.

== Career ==
Following his PhD studies, Sheldon became a Research Assistant Professor at San Francisco State University (1986–1987), then Assistant-to-Associate Curator of Birds at the Academy of Natural Sciences of Philadelphia (1987–1993), and then Associate-to-Full Curator of Genetic Resources at the Museum of Natural Science, Louisiana State University (LSU) (1994–2022). While at LSU, he was named the George H. Lowery Jr., Distinguished Professor of Natural Science in 2005, Professor of Biological Sciences in 2008, Director of the Museum of Natural Science from 2001 to 2013, and professor emeritus in 2022.

Sheldon began his research career using DNA-DNA hybrid comparisons to study bird phylogeny and genome evolution. In the 1990s, he studied ecological and behavioral patterns in light of phylogeny. More recently, he collaborated in large efforts to reconstruct the phylogeny of birds using modern genomic methods. Throughout his career, starting in 1976 and particularly since 2000, he has studied the biogeography, ecology, and conservation of Bornean birds.
