= Shel =

Shel is a masculine given name, usually a short form of Sheldon. People named Shel include:

- Shel Bachrach (1944–2024), American insurance broker, investor, businessman and philanthropist
- Shel Dorf (1933–2009), American comic book enthusiast and founder of San Diego Comic-Con
- Shel Kaphan (born 1952/3), American computer programmer and first employee of technology company Amazon
- Shel Macrae (1943–2022), born Andrew Raeburn Semple, lead singer and rhythm guitarist of the English band The Fortunes from 1966 to 1977
- Shel Silverstein (1930–1999), American writer known for his cartoons, songs and children's books
- Shel Talmy (born 1937), American record producer, songwriter and arranger
- Shel Trapp (1935–2010), American community organizer
