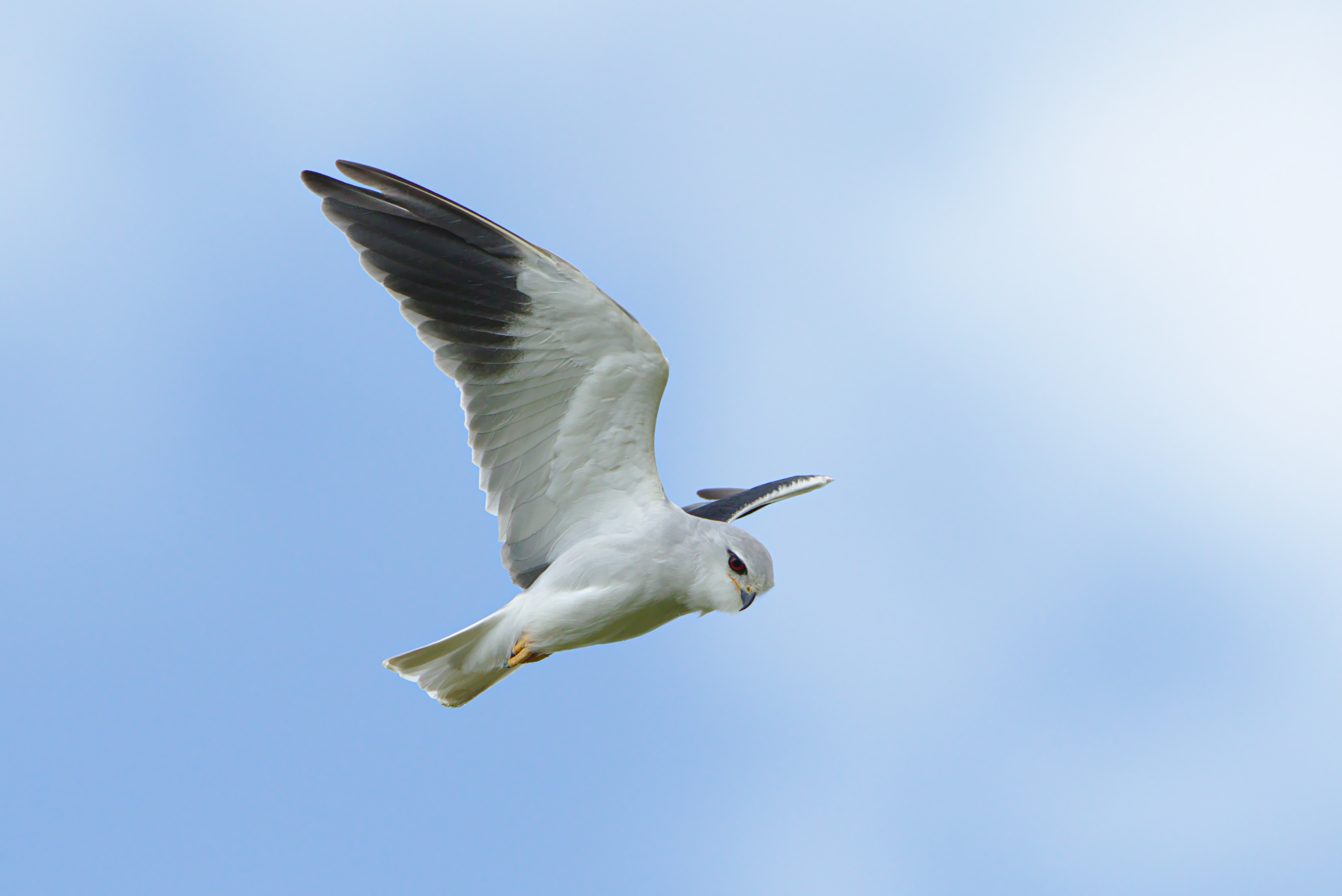
- Black-winged kite (Elanus caeruleus)

Scientific classification
- Kingdom: Animalia
- Phylum: Chordata
- Class: Aves
- Order: Accipitriformes
- Family: Accipitridae
- Subfamily: Elaninae

Genera
- Elanus; Chelictinia; Gampsonyx

= Elaninae =

Elanine kites

Subfamily of birds

An elanine kite is any of several small, lightly-built raptors with long, pointed wings.

Some authorities list the group as a formal subfamily, Elaninae. As a subfamily there are six species in three genera with two of these genera being monotypic. Two other species have at times been included with the group, but genetic research has shown them to belong to different subfamilies.

Elanine kites have a near-worldwide distribution, with two endemic species found in the Americas, two in Australia, and one in Africa, while the black-winged kite is found over a vast range from Europe and Africa in the west to Southeast Asia in the east.

== Species ==
=== Current Elaninae ===
Image	Genus	Living species
	Elanus Savigny, 1809	Black-winged kite, Elanus caeruleus – Africa, Asia, Europe; Black-shouldered kite, Elanus axillaris – Australia; White-tailed kite, Elanus leucurus – Americas; Letter-winged kite, Elanus scriptus – Australia
	Chelictinia (Lesson, 1843)	Scissor-tailed kite, Chelictinia riocourii – Africa
	Gampsonyx Vigors, 1825	Pearl kite, Gampsonyx swainsonii – South America

=== Previously in Elaninae ===
- Genus Machaerhamphus or Macheiramphus (Note: The choice between Westerman's name Machaerhamphus and Bonaparte's Macheiramphus has been problematic. See bat hawk for further information.) (subfamily Harpiinae)
  - Bat hawk, M. alcinus – Paleotropics (Africa, south Asia through to New Guinea)
- Genus Elanoides (subfamily Perninae)
  - Swallow-tailed kite, Elanoides forficatus – Americas

== Description ==
Elanus species are primarily rodent hunters, searching for prey from a perch or often hovering like kestrels. Their tail is unforked. Chelictinia feeds on the wing, taking insects from the air, or small reptiles and insects from tree branches. Its tail is very long and deeply forked, like Elanoides which has similar feeding habits but is larger.

Both Elanus and Chelictinia have similarities in markings, with red eyes, a black patch above the eye, yellow legs and cere, and black beak.

Gampsonyx is very small, also feeding on insects, with the size and coloration typical of the Asian falconets. It is black above and white below, often with a tinge of rufous around the legs.

== Taxonomy and systematics ==
In 1851 British zoologist Edward Blyth described Elaninae, the "smooth clawed kites", as a formal subfamily of Accipitridae. (Note: See "The Taxonomicon Taxon Tree: Elaninae". Archived from the original on 2014-10-28. and choose classification by Brodkorb 1964 or Grzimek 1974.) However they are also grouped in Accipitrinae, the broader subfamily of hawks and eagles described by French ornithologist Louis Pierre Vieillot in 1816.

Nicholas Vigors in 1824 had grouped Elanus and "true Milvus" together into Stirps Milvina, the kites. Earlier, the terms "kite" in English or "iktinos" in Greek referred only to the red or black (milvine) kites. French ornithologists used the term "milan" for both the milvine and elanine kites.

Around the same time, in 1823, Louis-Pierre Vieillot had placed the group (in five species) together into his own genus Elanoïdes, rather than Savigny's Elanus. Vigors listed three known species: Elanus melanopterus, E. furcatus, and E. Riocourii. (Note: "F. melanopterus Daud." is probably a junior synonym for Falco caeruleus Desfontaines 1789. "F. furcurtus Linn." is the swallow-tailed kite, which appears in the 10th edition of Systema Naturae as Falco forficatus, but as F. furcatus in the 12th edition.) But he noted that the latter two had more forked tails and probably didn't have nails that were rounded underneath. The following year he gained access to specimens of the fork-tailed kites and split them from Elanus into a separate genus, Nauclerus.

In 1931, Peters used the subfamily Elaninae, listing its members as Elanus, Chelictinia, and Machaeramphus. (Note: Peters gives the species and taxonomic authorities as follows: Elanus Savigny 1809 (7 subspecies in 4 species, see source for details); Chelictinia Lesson 1843 (monospecific, C. ricourii previously Elanoïdes ricourii Vieillot 1822); and Machaeramphus Westerman 1848 (M. alcinus alcinus Westerman 1848 and M. a. anderssoni (= Stringonyx anderssoni Gurney 1865)).) He placed Elanoïdes in subfamily Perninae, (Note: Elanoïdes Vieillot 1818, containing E. forficatus forficatus (=Falco forficatus Linné) and E. f. ytapa (=Milvus ytapa Vieillot 1818)) and Gampsonyx with the forest falcons in Polyhieracinae. In the 1950s, several authors found Gampsonyx was related to Elanus rather than the falcons, based on morphological features and molt schedule.

Lerner and Mindell describe the Elaninae as: "Kites noted for having a bony shelf above the eye, Elanus is cosmopolitan, Gampsonyx is restricted to the New World and Chelictinia is found in Africa". This is in contrast to the Perninae, which are: "Kites mainly found in the tropics and specializing on insects and bee or wasp larvae, all lack the bony eye shield found in the Elaninae".

Comparisons of sequences for certain mitochondrial marker genes indicate that some elanine kites split early from the rest of the Accipitridae. Wink and Sauer-Gurth found that Elanus was less related than the osprey and secretary bird (which are often placed in a separate family), but noted that this was not strongly indicated. (Note: "Whether they share direct ancestry with the Accipitridae (as suggested by DNA-DNA hybridisation; Sibley & Ahlquist, 1990) cannot be settled with the current data set, since bootstrap values indicate a small support for these bifurcations.") However, Lerner and Mindell found that the osprey was less related, but Elanus leucurus was basal to the other Accipitridae.

Negro and colleagues have discussed convergent traits between kites in the genus Elanus and owls, such as a lower acidity of the stomach and some specialized flight feathers otherwise not found in diurnal raptors.

Lerner and Mindell also found that Elanoides forficatus grouped with Perninae, such as the type species Pernis apivorus and the Australian endemics Lophoictinia and Hamirostra. Chelictinia, Machaerhamphus, and Gampsonyx were not included in these genetic sequencing studies.
