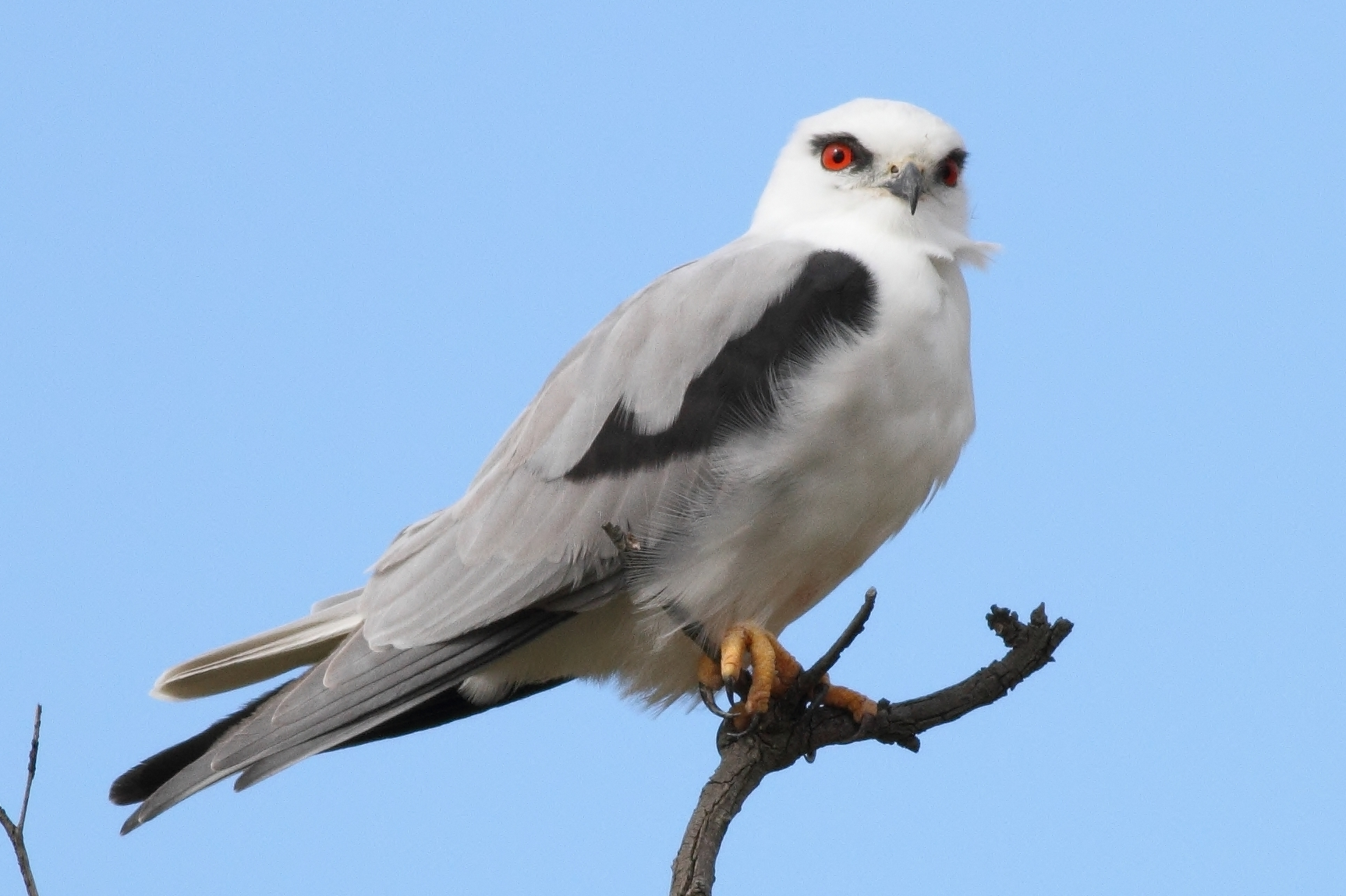
- A black-shouldered kite at the Royal Botanic Gardens Victoria, Melbourne, Victoria, Australia

Conservation status
- Least Concern (IUCN 3.1)

Scientific classification
- Kingdom: Animalia
- Phylum: Chordata
- Class: Aves
- Order: Accipitriformes
- Family: Accipitridae
- Genus: Elanus
- Species: E. axillaris

Binomial name
- Elanus axillaris (Latham, 1801)
- Range of black-shouldered kite

= Black-shouldered kite =

Small raptor found in Australia

The black-shouldered kite (Elanus axillaris), also known as the Australian black-shouldered kite, is a small raptor found in open habitats throughout Australia. It resembles similar species found in Africa, Eurasia and North America, including the black-winged kite, a species that has in the past also been called "black-shouldered kite". Measuring around 35 cm (14 in) in length, with a wingspan of 80–100 cm (31–39 in), the adult black-shouldered kite has predominantly grey-white plumage and prominent black markings above its red eyes. It gains its name from the black patches on its wings. The primary call is a clear whistle, uttered in flight and while hovering. It can be confused with the related letter-winged kite in Australia, which is distinguished by the striking black markings under its wings.

The species forms monogamous pairs, breeding between August and January. The birds engage in aerial courtship displays which involve high circling flight and ritualised feeding mid-air. Three or four eggs are laid and incubated for around thirty days. Chicks are fully fledged within five weeks of hatching and can hunt for mice within a week of leaving the nest. Juveniles disperse widely from their home territory. The black-shouldered kite hunts in open grasslands, searching for its prey by hovering and systematically scanning the ground. It mainly eats small rodents, particularly the introduced house mouse, and has benefitted from the modification of the Australian landscape by agriculture. It is rated as least concern on the International Union for Conservation of Nature (IUCN)'s Red List of Threatened Species.

== Taxonomy ==
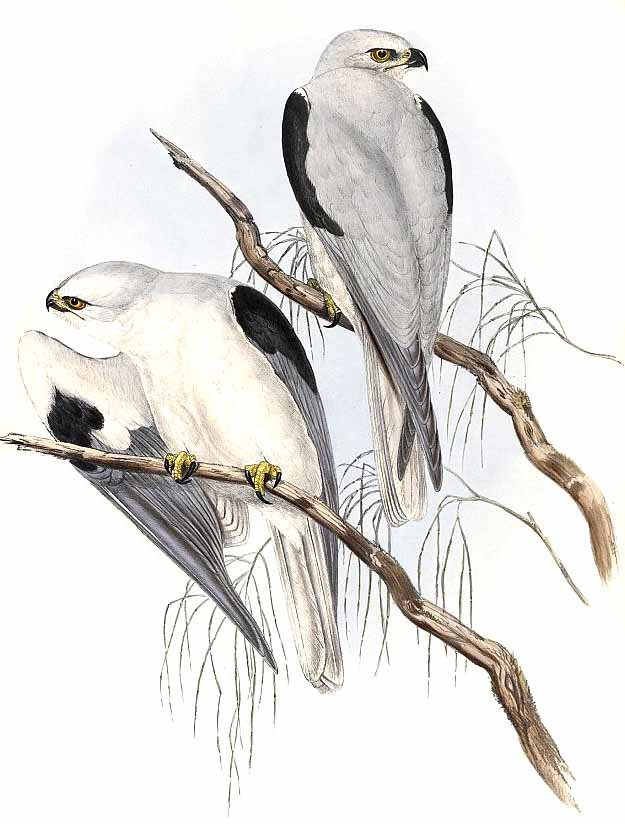
Illustration in John Gould's Birds of Australia, 1840s

The black-shouldered kite was first described by English ornithologist John Latham in 1801, as Falco axillaris. Its specific name is derived from the Latin axilla, meaning "armpit", relating to the dark patches under the wings. He reported the description came from a bird that had been kept for two months in the early colony. The species description was based on one of four paintings by Australian painter Thomas Watling of a bird in the Sydney district in the 1790s.

English naturalist John Gould described the same species as Elanus notatus in 1838 from a specimen from New South Wales, apparently unaware of Latham's description. English zoologist George Robert Gray followed Latham using the binomial Elanus axillaris in 1849. Gould conceded Latham's name was valid and hence had precedence, and E. notatus was reduced to synonymy. Australian ornithologist Gregory Mathews argued that Latham's description mentioned black axillaries and hence must have referred to the letter-winged kite, and that Watling's drawings were inconclusive. He promoted the use of E. notatus over E. axillaris in 1916. This was followed for many years. But in 1980 Australian taxonomists Richard Schodde and Ian J. Mason refuted Mathews' claim that the original description of E. axillaris was ambiguous and reinstated the name. This has been followed by subsequent authorities. The black-shouldered kite has no recognised subspecies.

"Black-shouldered kite" has been designated the official English name by the International Ornithologists' Union (IOC). It has also been called the Australian black-shouldered kite to distinguish it from the Eurasian black-winged kite (E. caeruleus) and American white-tailed kite (E. leucurus)—both formerly known as "black-shouldered kite". Watling had recorded the Dharug term Geo-ga-rack.

In 1959, American ornithologist Kenneth C. Parkes noted that the plumage of the black-shouldered kite is similar to that of the black-winged and white-tailed kites, and proposed that all three were subspecies of a single cosmopolitan species E. caeruleus—much like the peregrine falcon (Falco peregrinus). Researchers William S. Clark and Richard C. Banks disputed this, pointing out the differences in anatomical proportions such as wing shape and tail length, and hunting behavior (E. caeruleus rarely hunts by hovering, unlike the other two species) and proposed the species be separated again in 1992. They are regarded as distinct in the IOC World Bird List.

Molecular evidence shows that the black-shouldered kite and its relatives belong to a subfamily Elaninae that is an early offshoot within the raptor family Accipitridae. There is some evidence they are more divergent from other raptors and better placed in their own family.

== Description ==
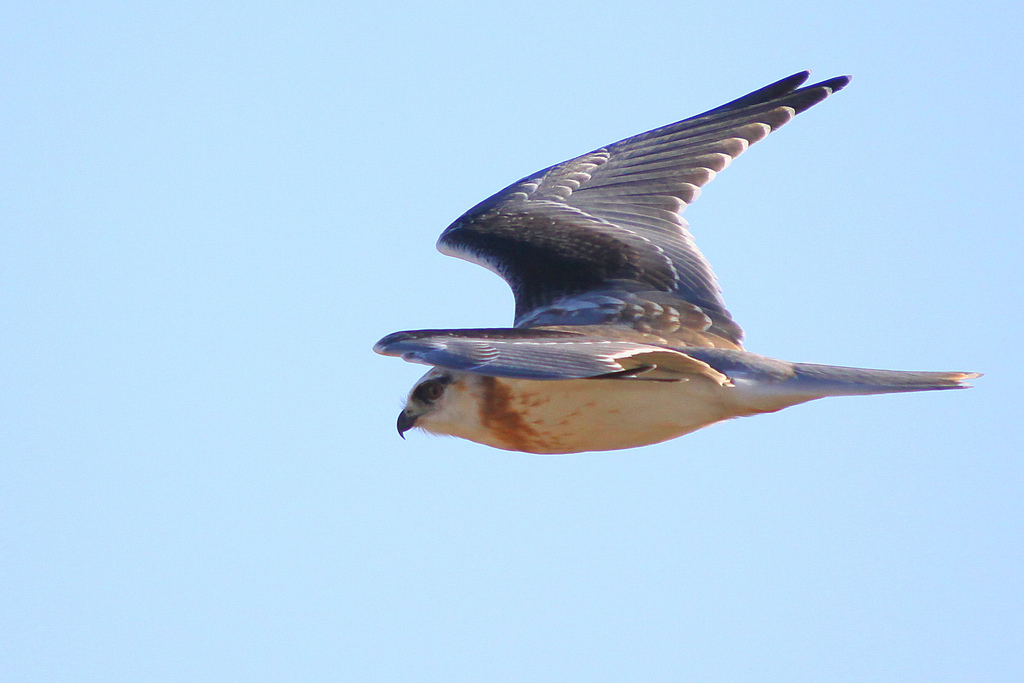
Immature bird with buff markings

The adult black-shouldered kite is around 35 cm (14 in) in length, with a wingspan of between 80 and 100 cm (31 and 39 in). The female is slightly heavier, weighing on average around 300 g (11 oz) compared to the male's average weight of 260 g (9.2 oz). The sexes have similar plumage. The crown, neck and upperparts are pale grey, while the head and underparts are white. A black comma-shaped marking lies in front of and stretches over and behind the eye, which is deep red and surrounded by a black orbital ring. The leading edge of the outer wing is black. When perched, this gives the species its prominent black "shoulders". The central rectrices of the tail are pale grey, while the rest of the tail feathers are white. The bill is short with a sharp, hooked tip to the upper mandible. Its nostrils and the cere are bright or dull yellow and the bill is black. The legs and feet are also yellow or golden-yellow, and the feet have three toes facing forwards and one toe facing backwards.

The juvenile has a white forehead and chin and rusty brown neck, nape and breast with darker streaks. The back and wings are mottled buff or brown. There is a less distinctive dark shoulder patch, but a larger comma-shaped patch over the eyes. The eyes themselves are dark brown. The bill is black with a horn-coloured cere.

Black-shouldered kites spiral into the wind like a kestrel. They soar with V-shaped up-curved wings, the primaries slightly spread and the tail widely fanned, giving the tail a squarer appearance and visible 'fingers' on the wings. In level flight progress is rather indirect. Their flight pattern has been described as 'winnowing' with soft steady beats interspersed with long glides on angled wings. They can most often be seen hovering with wings curved and tail pointing down.

The black-shouldered kite is very similar to the related letter-winged kite (E. scriptus), but has the black mark above and behind the eye, a white rather than grey crown, and shows all-white underparts in flight except for the black markings on the shoulder, dark wingtips, and a small black patch on the underwing. It is slightly larger than the nankeen kestrel (Falco cenchroides). The latter species lacks wing markings and has pale brown plumage. It keeps its wings level when soaring, and has a faster wingbeat when hovering. The grey falcon (Falco hypoleucos) has somewhat similar coloration to the black-shouldered kite but is bulkier and heavier overall and lacks the black markings. Its wings are barred, and it preys on birds. The grey goshawk (Accipiter novaehollandiae) has wider more rounded wings, underwing markings and glides with lowered wings.

=== Vocalisations ===
The black-shouldered kite is generally silent, except in the breeding season when its calls, though weak, can be persistent. It primarily utters a clear whistled chee, chee, chee call in flight and while hovering, or a hoarse wheezing skree-ah when perched. A short high whistle is the primary contact call between a pair, while a harsh scraping call is the most common call used by the female and large young, and brooding females call to their young with a deep, soft, frog-like croak.

A variety of different calls have been recorded from captive birds, including harsh, harmonic, chatter and whistle vocalisations. Harsh calls were made when a bird was alarmed or agitated, whistle-type calls were emitted in general contexts, sometimes monotonously, and shorter duration "chatter" calls were given when a bird sighted a human near the enclosure.

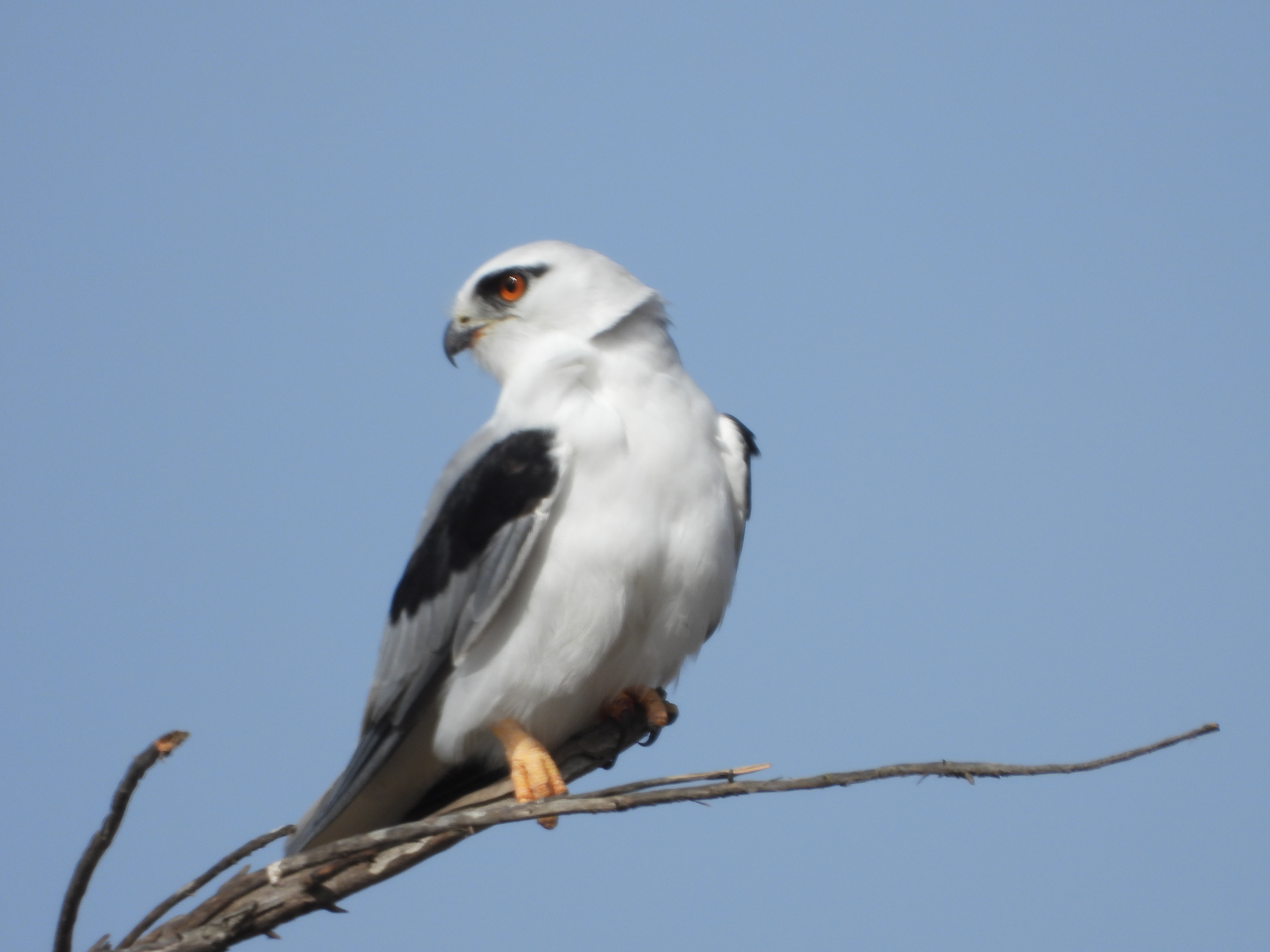
Perched on a branch

== Distribution and habitat ==
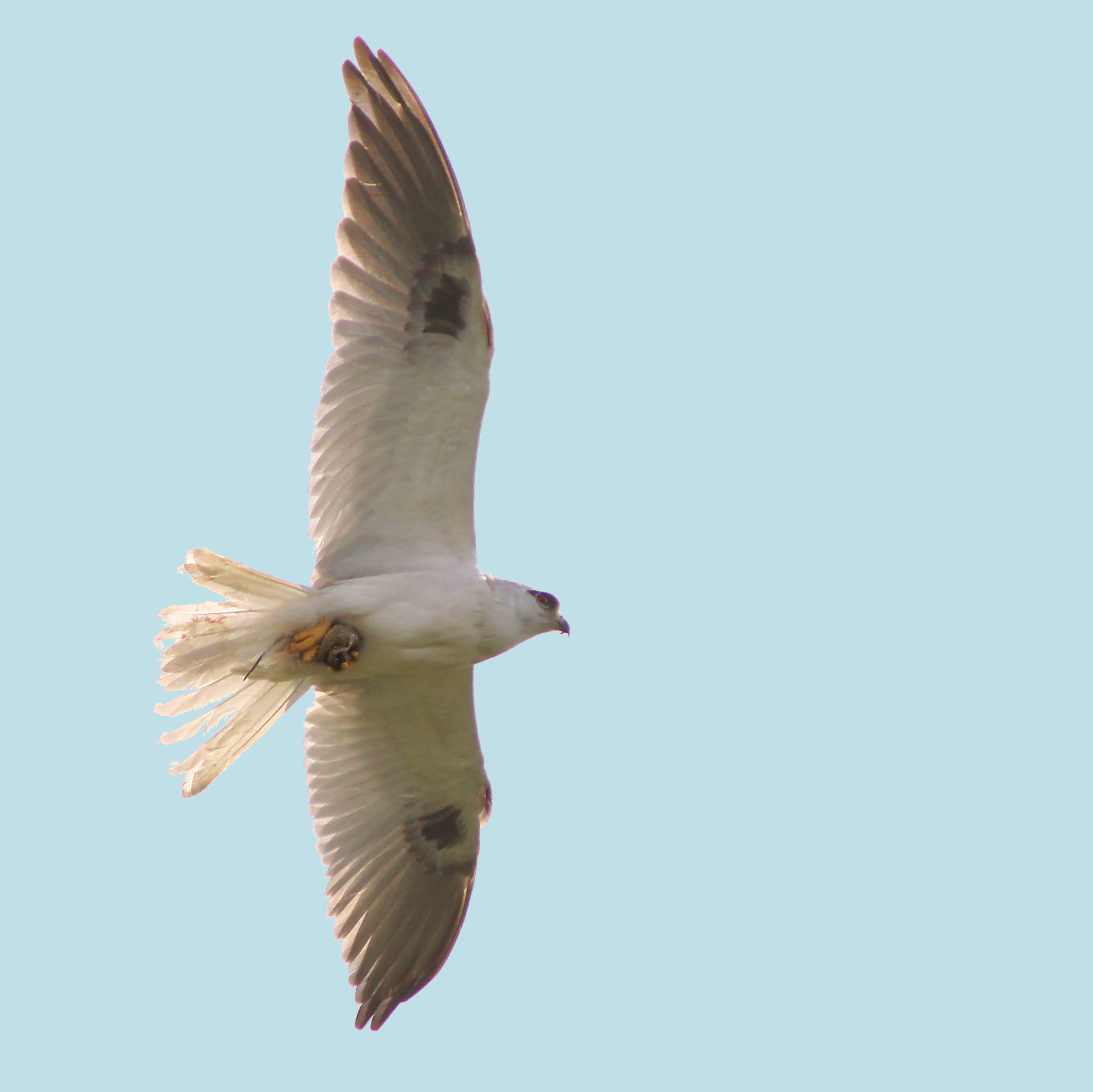
Flying with a mouse in its talons. Also showing small black underwing patches visible in flight

Black-shouldered kites may be sedentary or nomadic and are generally found in open grasslands or valleys where there are scattered clumps of trees, where the grass or groundcover is accessible from the air and ranges from 30 cm to 1.5 m (1–5 ft) high. As well as native grasslands they forage over pastures, cereal or vegetable crops and vineyards, often focusing on areas that have been recently harvested or ploughed and hence rendering prey more exposed. In urban areas, they are encountered on the edge of towns on wasteland, irregularly mown areas, sports fields, golf courses or grassy roadside verges. They also hunt over coastal dunes and drier marshland, but avoid areas with dense cover such as forest as well as bare or rocky ground.

Their numbers fluctuate during drought and floods and can be irruptive in response to sudden increases in mouse populations. The most distant banding recovery was from the Red Banks area in South Australia to Lithgow in eastern New South Wales three and a half years later, a distance of 1,073 km (667 mi).

Although reported throughout Australia, they are most common in the relatively fertile south-east and south-west corners of the mainland, and in south-east Queensland. They are rare in the deep desert and dryer areas such as western Cape York or the Northern Territory, and are occasional visitors to northern Tasmania, King Island, and the Torres Strait islands.

== Behaviour ==
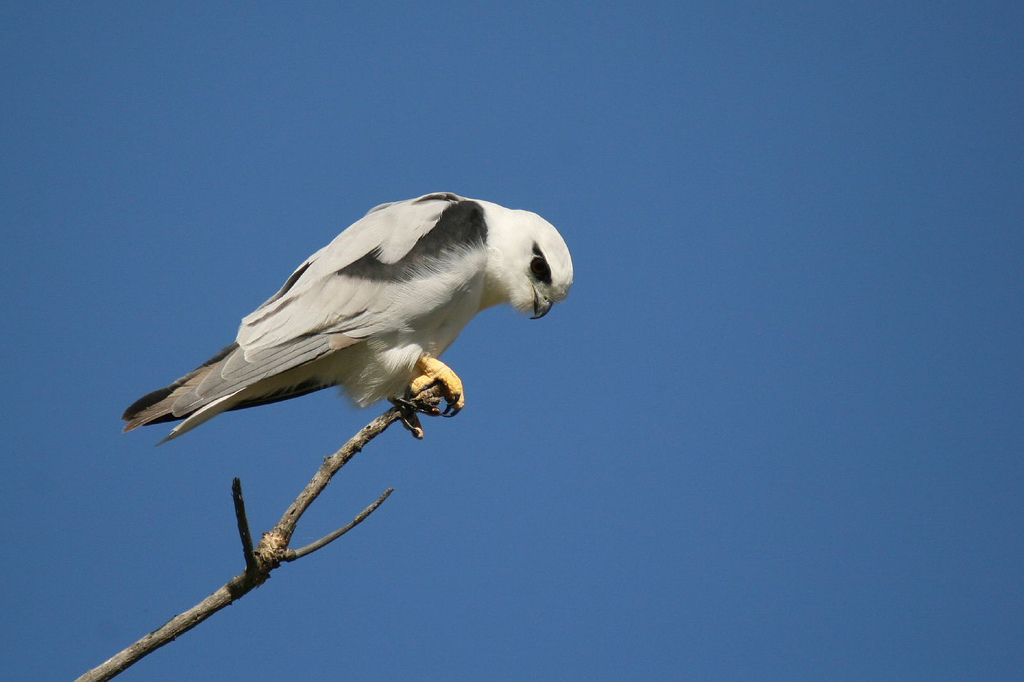
Hunting from a perch

Black-shouldered kites usually hunt singly or in pairs, though where food is plentiful they occur in small family groups and can be loosely gregarious at times of irruptions, with up to 70 birds reported feeding together during a mouse plague. They roost communally, like other Elanus species. They are territorial when food is not abundant. The practice of "tail flicking" where, on landing, the tail is flicked up and lowered and the movement repeated persistently is thought to be a possible territorial display.

=== Breeding ===
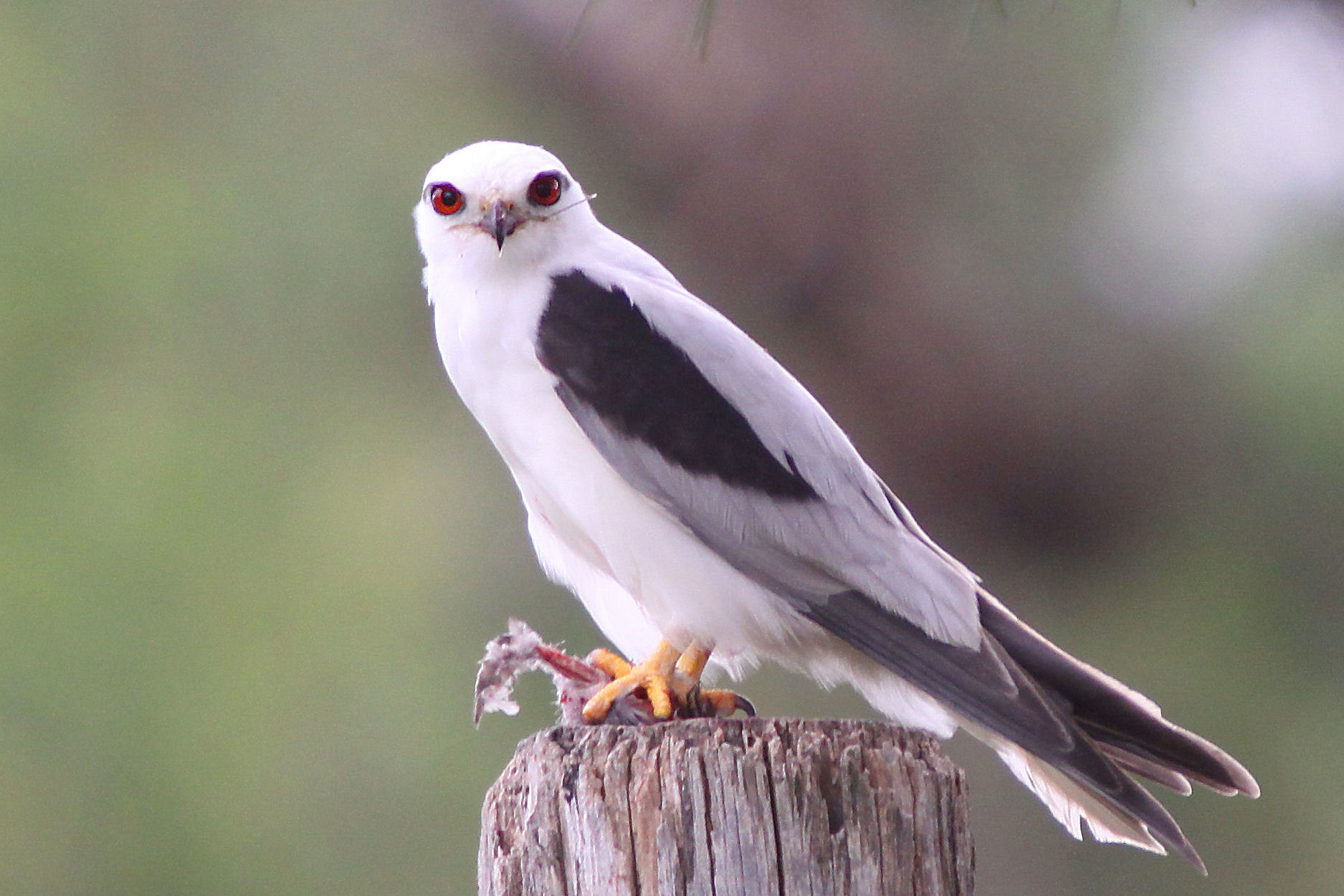
Mature bird with prey

Aerial courtship displays involve single and mutual high circling flight, and the male may fly around with wings held high rapidly fluttering, known as flutter-flight. Courting males dive at the female, feeding her in mid-flight. The female grabs food from the male's talons with hers while flipping upside-down. They may lock talons and tumble downwards in a ritualised version of grappling, but release just before landing. All courtship displays are accompanied by constant calling.

Black-shouldered kites form monogamous pairs. The breeding season is usually August to January, but is responsive to mice populations, and some pairs breed twice in a good season. Both sexes collect material for the nest but the female alone builds it. A large untidy shallow cup of sticks usually in the foliage near the top of trees, the nest takes anywhere from two to six weeks to be built. It is constructed of thin twigs and is around 28 to 38 cm (11 to 15 in) across when newly built, but growing to around 78 cm (31 in) across and 58 cm (23 in) deep after repeated use. The nest is lined with green leaves and felted fur, though linings of grass and cow dung have also been reported. It is generally located in the canopy of an isolated or exposed tree in open country, elevated 5 to 20 m (16 to 66 ft) or more above the ground. Black-shouldered kites have been known to use old Australian magpie, crow or raven nests.

Females perform most of the care of eggs and nestlings, though males take a minor share of incubation and brooding. The clutch consists of three to four dull white eggs of a tapered oval shape measuring 42 mm × 31 mm (1.7 in × 1.2 in) and with red-brown blotches that are often heavier around the larger end of the egg. The eggs are laid at intervals of two to five days. The female incubates the eggs for 30 days and when the eggs hatch the chicks are helpless but have soft down covering their body. For the first two weeks or so the female broods the chicks constantly, both day and night. She does no hunting at all for the first three weeks after hatching, but calls to the male from the nest, and he generally responds by bringing food. The female feeds the chicks with the mice brought back to the nest by the male, feeding them in tiny pieces for the first week or two, at which time the chicks are capable of swallowing a mouse whole. The nestling period lasts around 36 days, and the post-fledging period at least 36 days with parental feeding for at least 22 days. When the chicks are older both parents take it in turns to feed them. Black feathers start to appear along the chicks' wings when they are about a fortnight old, and they are fully fledged and are ready to fly in five weeks. Within a week of leaving the nest the young birds are capable of hunting for mice on their own.

Juveniles disperse widely, taking up territory that can be as far as 1,000 km (600 mi) from the nest site.

=== Food and hunting ===
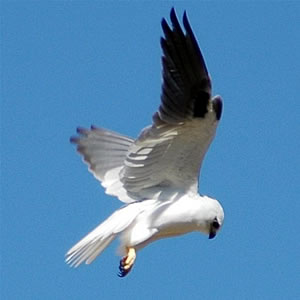
Hovering while hunting

The black-shouldered kite has become a specialist predator of the introduced house mouse, often following outbreaks of mouse plagues in rural areas. It takes other suitably-sized creatures when available, including grasshoppers, rats, small reptiles, birds, and even (very rarely) rabbits, but mice and other mouse-sized mammals account for over 90% of its diet. Its influence on mouse populations is probably significant; adults take two or three mice a day each if they can, around a thousand mice a year. On one occasion, a male was observed bringing no less than 14 mice to a nest of well-advanced fledglings within an hour. In another study, a female kite was seen to struggle back to fledglings in the nest with a three-quarters grown rabbit, a heavy load for such a small bird.

Like other elanid kites, the black-shouldered kite hunts by quartering grasslands for small creatures. This can be from a perch, but more often by hovering in mid-air. It is diurnal, preferring to hunt during the day, particularly in the early morning and mid to late afternoon, and occasionally hunts in pairs. Its hunting pattern, outside breeding periods and periods of abundant prey, has distinct crepuscular peaks, perhaps corresponding to mouse activity. When hunting, the kite hovers with its body hanging almost vertically, and its head into the wind. Unlike the nankeen kestrel, the black-winged kite shows no obvious sideways movement, even in a strong breeze. One study of a nesting pair noted that the male searched aerially for 82% of the search time. Typically, a kite hovers 10 to 12 m (35 to 40 ft) above a particular spot, peering down intently, sometimes for only a few seconds, often for a minute or more, then glides swiftly to a new vantage point and hovers again. When hunting from a perch, a dead tree is the preferred platform. Like other Elanus kites, the black-shouldered kite grips a vertical branch with a foot on either side, each one above the other and turned inwards, which enables them to maintain a secure footing on relatively small branches. Though hovering is the most common hunting method, the kites have been observed searching the ground beneath a vantage point for periods of up to an hour.

When a mouse or other prey is spotted, the kite drops silently onto it, feet-first with wings raised high; sometimes in one long drop to ground level, more often in two or more stages, with hovering pauses at intermediate heights. Prey is seized in the talons and about 75% of attacks are successful. Prey can either be eaten in flight or carried back to a perch. Birds will have a favoured feeding perch, beneath which accumulate piles of pellets or castings.

== Conservation status ==
The arrival of Europeans to Australia has, on the whole, benefited the black-shouldered kite through land clearing, irrigation for agriculture, grain harvesting, and storage practices which provide suitable conditions for much larger numbers of mice. As the species has a large range and an increasing population, it is listed as "Least Concern" on the IUCN Red List of Threatened species. In southwestern Australia, it has become one of the most commonly recorded raptors in the wheatbelt. According to raptor researcher Stephen Debus, this species did not suffer from eggshell thinning during the period of DDT use in Australia, though he believes secondary poisoning is possible from rodenticides used during mouse plagues or from pesticides used during locust plagues. Populations in areas with high sheep and rabbit numbers may decline, as these animals compact the soil and reduce the available habitat for mice.
