= Nauclerus =

Nauclerus may refer to:

- A ship-owner in ancient Greece and Rome
- Johannes Nauclerus (c. 1425 – 1510), 16th-century Swabian historian and humanist
- Nauclerus (bird), an obsolete genus of birds of prey
