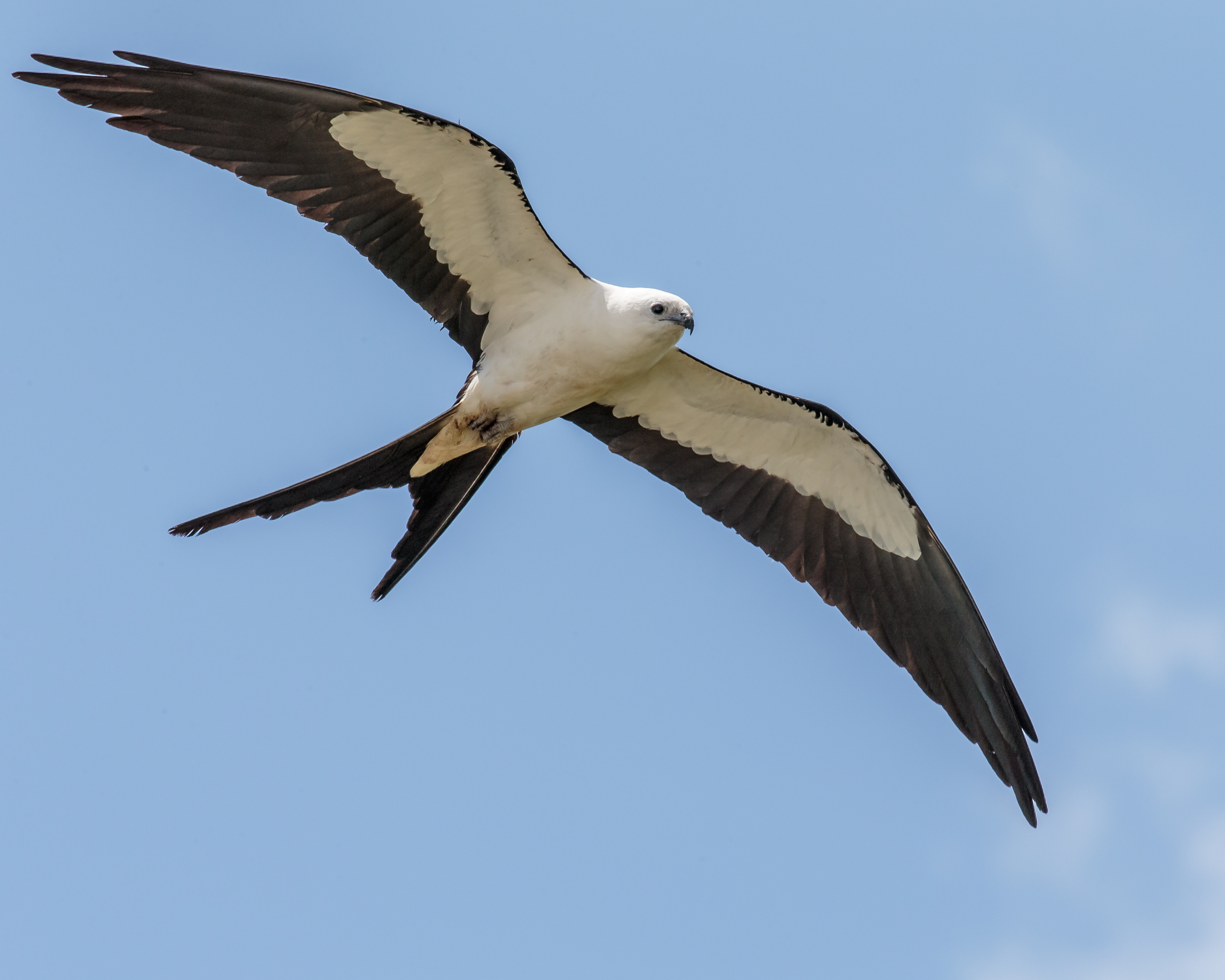

Conservation status
- Least Concern (IUCN 3.1)

Scientific classification
- Kingdom: Animalia
- Phylum: Chordata
- Class: Aves
- Order: Accipitriformes
- Family: Accipitridae
- Genus: Elanoides; Vieillot, 1818
- Species: E. forficatus

Binomial name
- Elanoides forficatus (Linnaeus, 1758)

Subspecies
- E. f. forficatus (Linn. 1758); E. f. yetapa (Vieillot, 1818)
- Distribution: Year-round Breeding Migration

Synonyms
- Elanus forficatus (Linnaeus, 1758); Falco forficatus Linnaeus, 1758; Falco furcatus Linnaeus, 1766; Elanoides yetapa Vieillot, 1818 (now a subspecies); Nauclerus furcatus Vigors, 1825; Milvus furcatus (Linnaeus, 1766)

= Swallow-tailed kite =

Species of bird

The swallow-tailed kite (Elanoides forficatus) is a pernine raptor which breeds from the southeastern United States to eastern Peru and northern Argentina. It is the only species in the genus Elanoides. Most North and Central American breeders winter in South America where the species is resident year round.

== Taxonomy and systematics ==
The swallow-tailed kite was first described as the "swallow-tail hawk" and "accipiter cauda furcata" (forked-tail hawk) by the English naturalist Mark Catesby in 1731. It was given the binomial scientific name Falco forficatus by Carl Linnaeus in the 10th edition of Systema Naturae, published in 1758; he changed this to Falco furcatus in the 12th edition of 1766. The latter spelling was used widely during the 18th and 19th centuries, but the original spelling has precedence. The genus Elanoides was introduced by the French ornithologist Louis Pierre Vieillot in 1818. The name is from Ancient Greek elanos for "kite" and -oides for "resembling".

== Description ==
The species is 50 to 68 cm (20 to 27 in) in length, with a wingspan of approximately 1.12–1.36 m (3.7–4.5 ft). Male and female individuals appear similar. The body weight is 310–600 g (11–21 oz). The body is a contrasting deep black and white. The flight feathers, tail, feet, bill are all black. Another characteristic is the elongated, forked tail at 27.5–37 cm (10.8–14.6 in) long, hence the name swallow-tailed. The wings are also relatively elongated, as the wing chord measures 39–45 cm (15–18 in). The tarsus is fairly short for the size of the bird at 3.3 cm (1.3 in). The body is a contrasting deep black and white. The upper side of the wings is black along with the tail, feet, and bill. The underside of the wings is partly black and partly white.

Young swallow-tailed kites are duller in color than the adults, and the tail is not as deeply forked. Sometimes a high-pitched chirp is emitted, though the birds mostly remain silent.

== Habitat and distribution ==
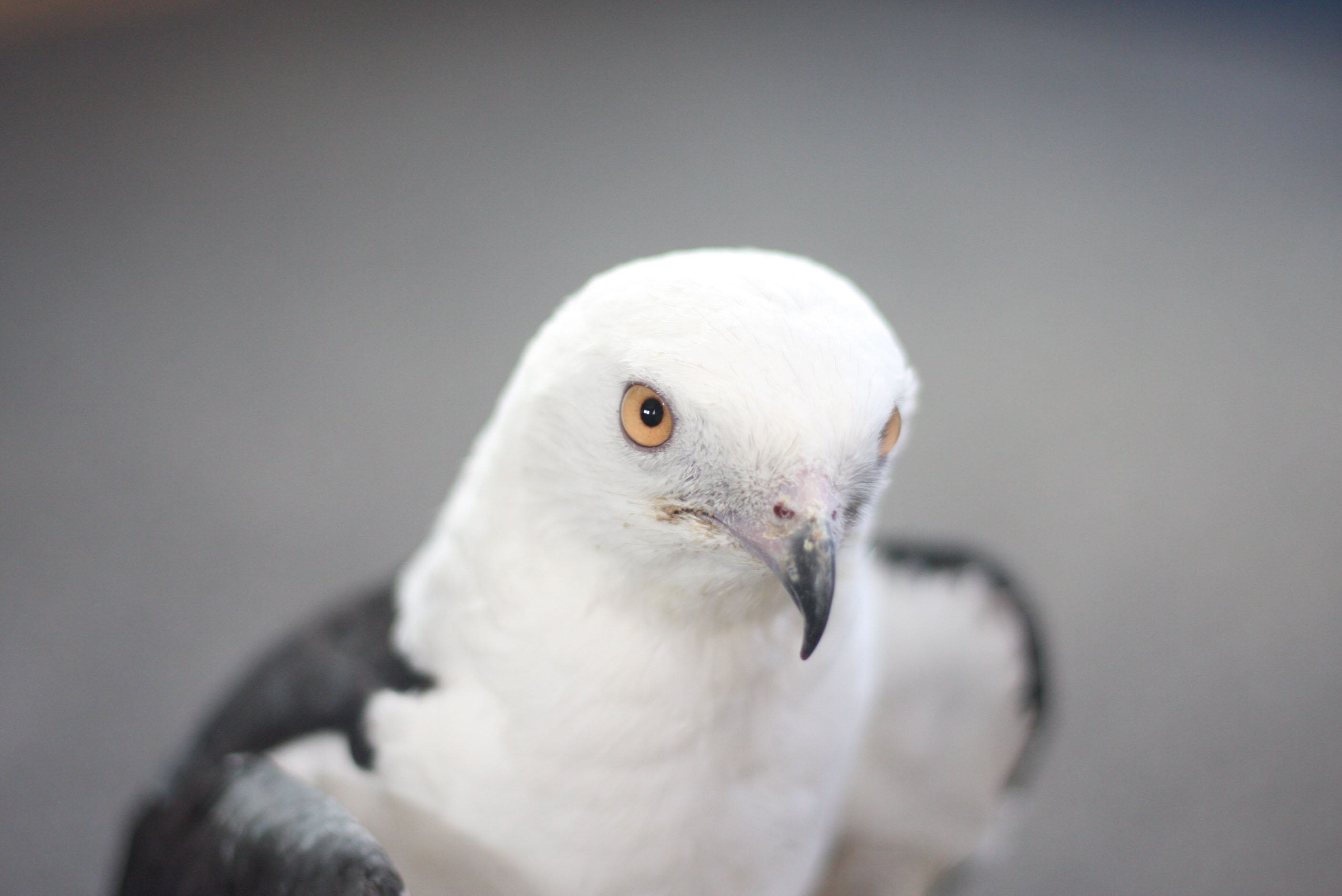
Swallow-tailed kite

The swallow-tailed kite is largely associated with large tracts of wetland forests which accommodates the bird's nesting habits. Loblolly pines (Pinus taeda) are the most prevalent choice for building nests but bald cypress (Taxodium distichum) are also used when the pines are unavailable. The major requirement of these nesting sites are food availability and tree height. Nesting locations are often found in trees as high as 100 ft (30 m). Historic ranges in the United States covered the majority of the Southern states and much of the Midwest (in Kentucky, Indiana, Ohio, Illinois, Missouri, Iowa, Kansas, Nebraska, and as far north as Wisconsin and Minnesota). Aside from the US, it resides in many areas throughout Central and South America. Habitat degradation and changes in wetland hydrology have caused the range to shrink in the US to just coastal regions of the southeastern and southwestern US, roughly an 80% decline in population.

Swallow-tailed kites are considered migratory raptors and during the spring months often move from areas in Central and South America to breed. Roughly 3% of the world's population breed in the United States. Traveling thousands of miles these birds move towards the most suitable nesting habitat found within coastal wetlands between the Americas. Satellite-telemetry has allowed researchers to track movements of individual birds over the years and has yielded data that demonstrates some migration journeys longer than 10,000 mi (16,000 km). Land located within migration routes is thought to be another concern for the kites, as deforestation and habitat degradation in Central and South Americas can have adverse affects as the birds move to breed. The birds are considered one of the most graceful fliers seen in America and often spend the majority of their lives scouring high tree tops for lizards, small mammals, and insects. The morphology of the swallow-tailed kite's wing and tail structure allows the bird to glide effortlessly for long distances.

=== Diet ===
The swallow-tailed kite feeds on small reptiles, such as snakes and lizards. It may also feed on small amphibians such as frogs; large insects, such as grasshoppers, crickets, termites, ants, wasps, dragonflies, beetles, and caterpillars; small birds and their eggs and nestlings; and small mammals including bats. It has also been known to prey on fish. It has been observed to regularly consume fruit in Central America. It drinks by skimming the surface and collecting water in its beak. The bird usually does not break flight during feeding.

=== Reproduction ===
Mating occurs from March to May, with the female laying two to four eggs. They are white or bluish white, spotted with brown. Incubation lasts 28 days, and 36 to 42 days to fledge. Often thought to form monogamous pairs, the birds are thought to spend some time apart and meet up during migrations to nesting locations. These nesting locations are often found in the highest trees in wetland areas. On occasion, pairs will return to the same nesting locations of the previous years and refurbish old nests. Generally, nests take about four days to complete.

== Conservation in the United States ==
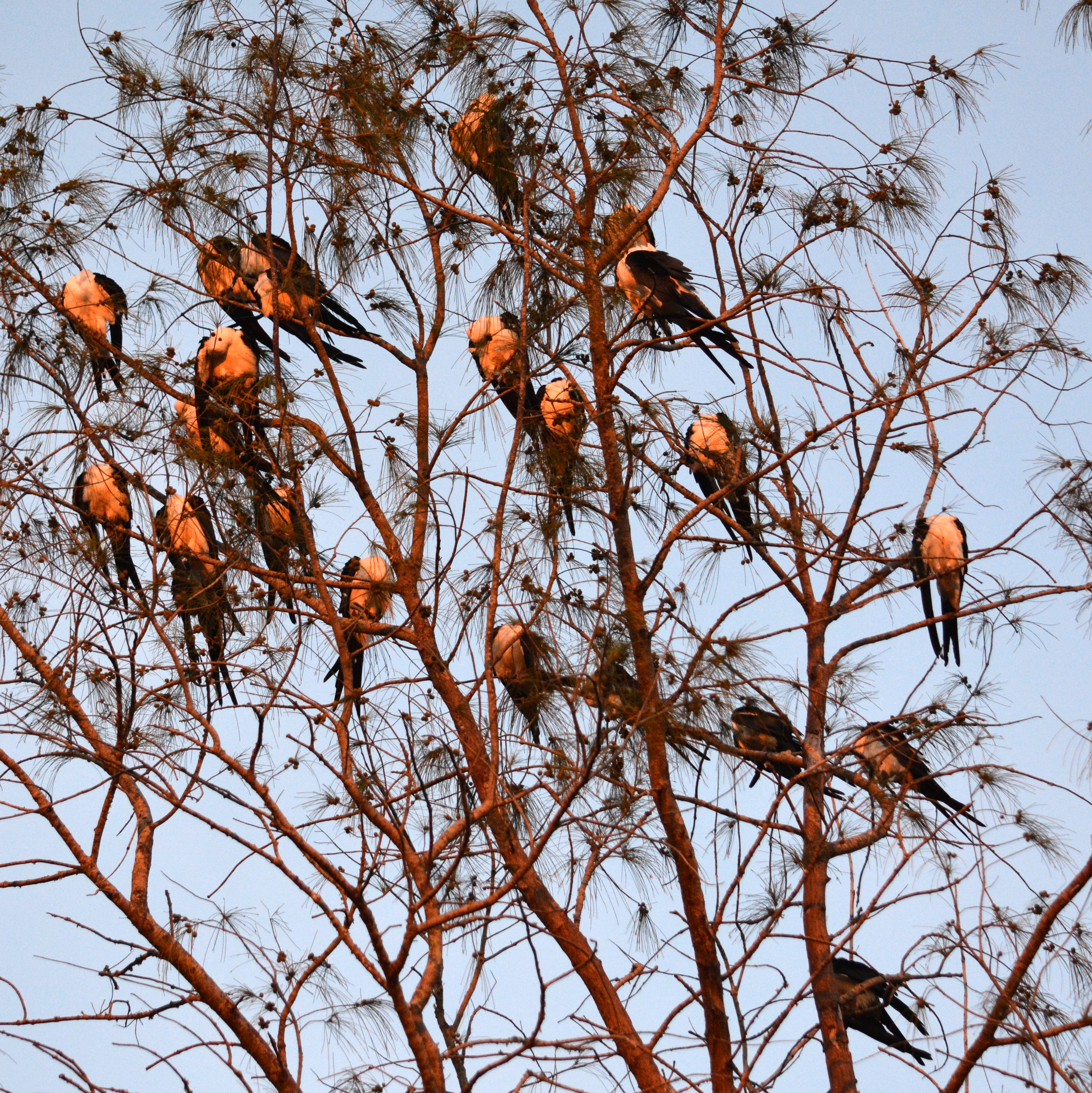
A group of more than 20 swallow-tailed kites gathering at sunset in Sanibel Island, Florida

Swallow-tailed kites are not listed as endangered or threatened by the federal government in the United States as of 2024. They are listed as endangered by the state of South Carolina and as threatened by the state of Texas. They are listed as "rare" by the state of Georgia.

The Center for Birds of Prey in Charleston, South Carolina has an ongoing effort to track sightings within the state. Anonymous reports can be made at Swallow-tailed Kite Sighting Form or by telephone. They will also send you the summary of the years reported sightings if you leave them your contact information.

Plate 72 of The Birds of America by John James Audubon, depicting the swallow-tailed "hawk" or kite

Destruction of habitats is chiefly responsible for the decline in numbers. A key conservation area is the Lower Suwannee National Wildlife Refuge in Florida. As of 2016, populations have seemed to stabilize and even show increasing trends. Successful habitat restoration and management has allowed these birds to reestablish nesting populations in areas of Georgia, Florida, and South Carolina.
