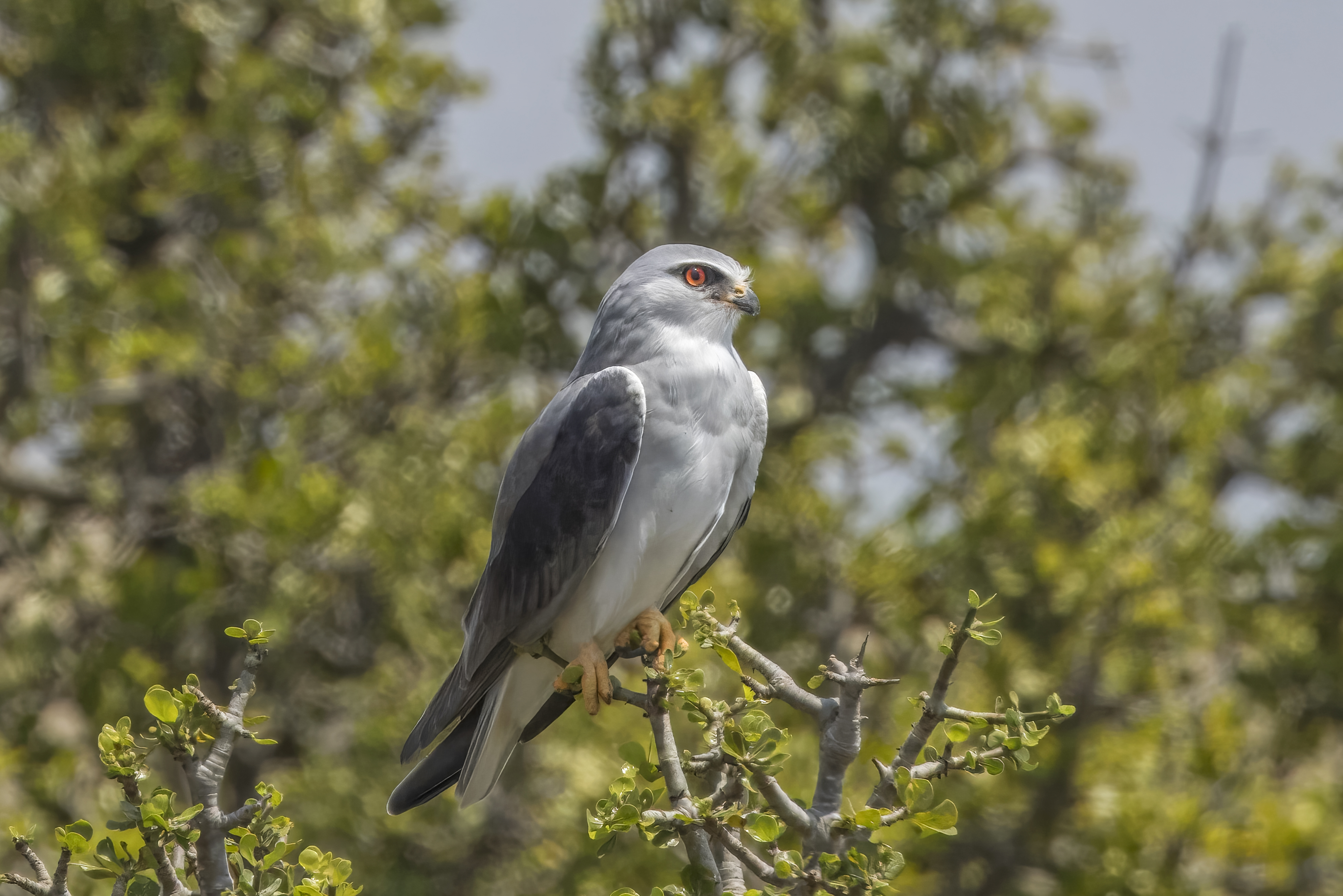
- Adult E. c. caeruleus Serengeti National Park, Tanzania
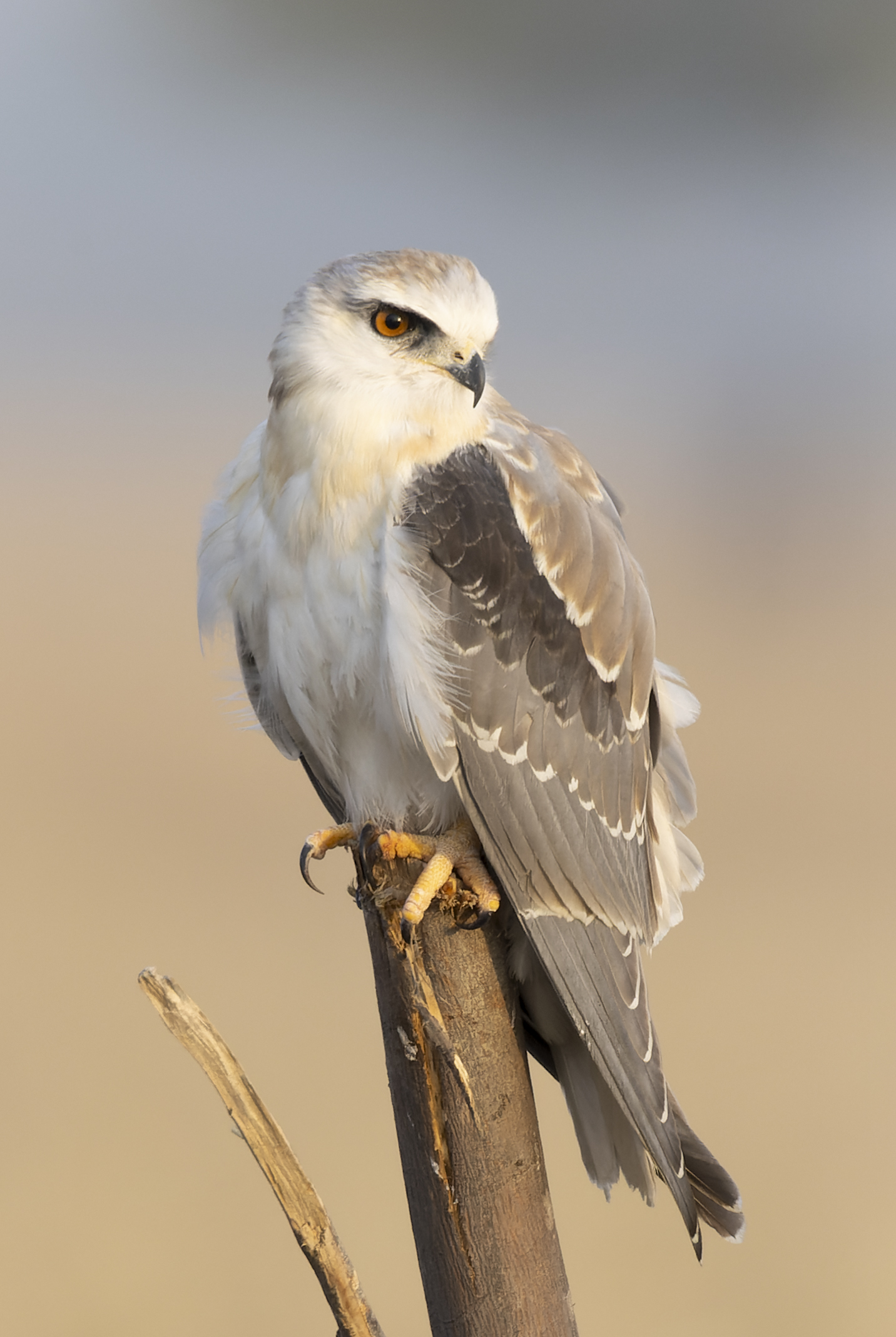
- Immature E. c. vociferus Tal Chhapar Sanctuary, Rajasthan, India.

Conservation status
- Least Concern (IUCN 3.1)

Scientific classification
- Kingdom: Animalia
- Phylum: Chordata
- Class: Aves
- Order: Accipitriformes
- Family: Accipitridae
- Genus: Elanus
- Species: E. caeruleus

Binomial name
- Elanus caeruleus (Desfontaines, 1789)

Subspecies
- E. c. caeruleus (Desfontaines, 1789); E. c. hypoleucus (Gould, 1859); E. c. vociferus (Latham, 1790)
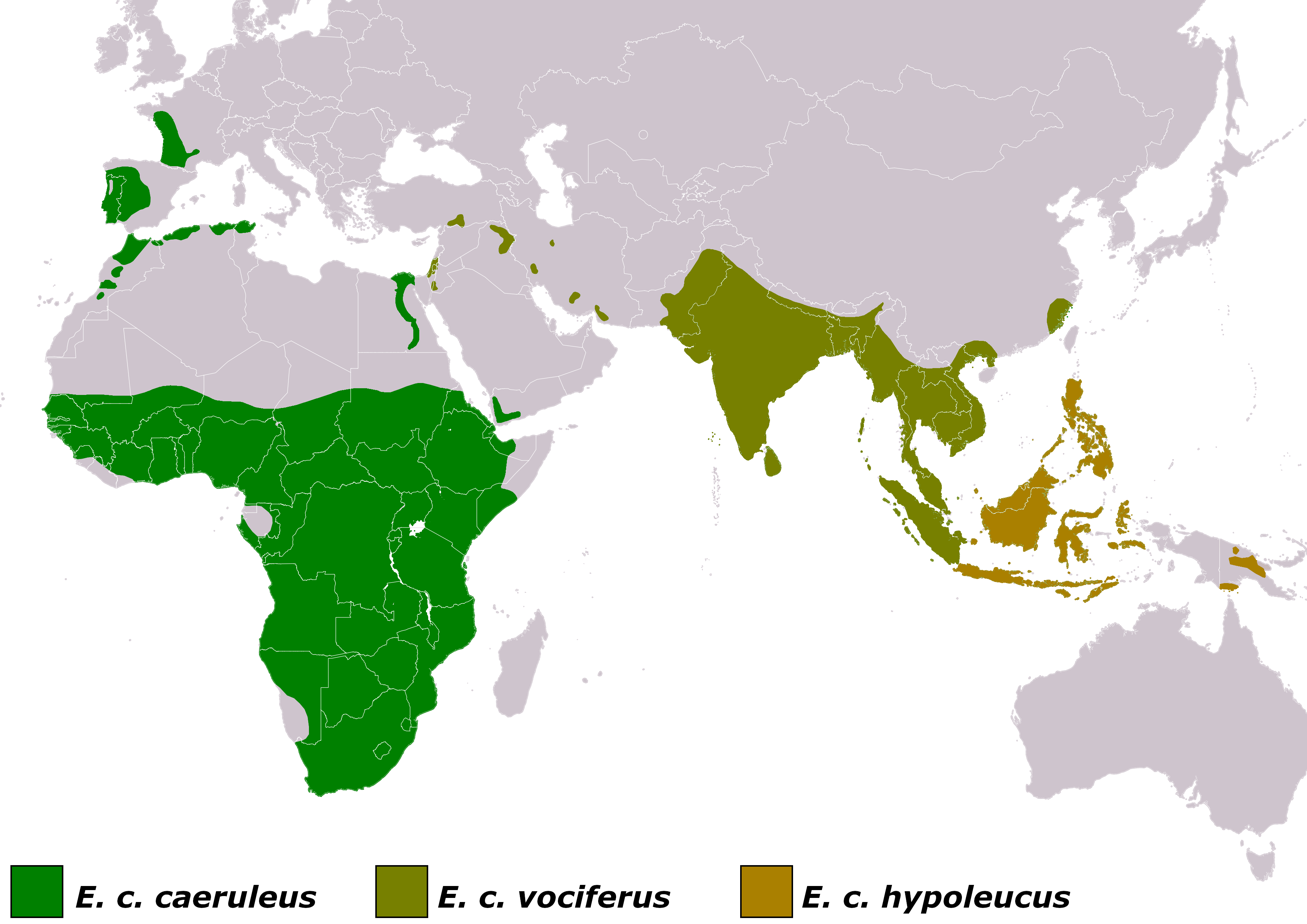
- Range of E. caeruleus

Synonyms
- Falco cæruleus Desf., 1789; Falco vociferus Latham, 1790; Falco melanopterus Daudin, 1800; Elanus cæsius Sav., 1809; Elanus melanopterus Leach, 1817

= Black-winged kite =

Raptor native to Eurasia

The black-winged kite (Elanus caeruleus), also known as the black-shouldered kite (not to be confused with the closely related Australian species of the same name), is a small diurnal bird of prey in the family Accipitridae best known for its habit of hovering over open grasslands in the manner of the much smaller kestrels. This Palearctic and Afrotropical species was sometimes combined with the Australian black-shouldered kite (Elanus axillaris) and the white-tailed kite (Elanus leucurus) of North and South America which together form a superspecies. This kite is distinctive, with long wings; white, grey and black plumage; and owl-like forward-facing eyes with red irises. The owl-like behaviour is even more pronounced in the letter-winged kite (Elanus scriptus), a nocturnal relative in Australia. Although mainly seen on plains, they are sometimes seen on grassy slopes of hills in the higher elevation regions of Asia. They are not migratory, but show nomadism in response to weather and food availability. They are well adapted to utilize periodic upsurges in rodent populations and can raise multiple broods in a single year unlike most birds of prey. Populations in southern Europe have grown in response to human activities, particularly agriculture and livestock rearing. It is now present in Southwest France.

== Taxonomy ==
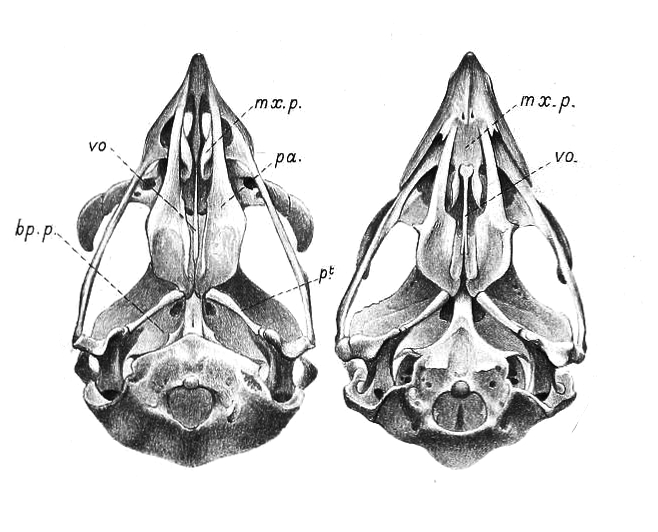
Comparison of skull of Elanus with Falco (right)

The black-winged kite was described by the French naturalist René Louiche Desfontaines in 1789 and given the binomial name Falco caeruleus. The type locality is the town of Algiers in Algeria. The black-winged kite is now one of four species placed in the genus Elanus that was introduced in 1809 by the French zoologist Jules-César Savigny. The genus Elanus is distinctive in having very small scales covering the foot and on the underside, scutellate scales are found only under the terminal phalanges. The claw lacks a groove on the underside. The name Elanus is from Ancient Greek elanos for a "kite". The specific epithet caeruleus is the Latin for "blue".

There are three subspecies:

- Elanus caeruleus caeruleus (Desfontaines, 1789) – southwest Iberian Peninsula, Africa, southwest Arabia
- Elanus caeruleus vociferus (Latham, 1790) – Pakistan to east China, Malay Peninsula and Indochina. The underwing secondaries are smoky grey and nearly white in the nominate subspecies.
- Elanus caeruleus hypoleucus Gould, 1859 – Greater and Lesser Sunda Islands, the Philippines, Sulawesi and New Guinea

== Description ==
This long-winged raptor is predominantly grey or white with black shoulder patches, wing tips and eye stripe. The long falcon-like wings extend beyond the tail when the bird is perched. In flight, the short and square tail is visible and it is not forked as in the typical kites of the genus Milvus. When perched, often on roadside wires, it often adjusts its wings and jerks its tail up and down as if to balance itself. The sexes are alike in plumage. Their large forward-facing eyes placed under a bony shelf that shades them is distinctive; their velvety plumage and zygodactyl feet are characters shared with owls and the genus has been considered as a basal group within the Accipitridae. They are thought to have been adapted for living in savanna habitats where seasonal rodent population peaks occur. Such food resources are also favoured by the owls. The inner vanes of the feathers have velvety barbules. They have a diploid chromosome number of 68 (some older studies claimed 64 for E.c.caeruleus and 66 for E.c.vociferus) with a distinct karyotype with resemblances to the kites and honey buzzards and suggesting a basal position within the diurnal birds of prey.

== Distribution and habitat ==
The black-winged kite is a species primarily of open land and semi-deserts in sub-Saharan Africa and tropical Asia, but it has a foothold within Europe in Spain and Portugal. The species range appears to be expanding in southern Europe and, more recently, also to West Asia. The first records of breeding in Europe were in the 1860s and since then they have become more widespread and populations are on the rise. It is thought that land-use changes, particularly agriculture and pastureland have helped the species. The species has expanded its range in southern Europe and vagrants from Switzerland and England indicate that the species is moving north.

Several geographic populations have been named as subspecies and these include the nominate subspecies which occurs in Spain, Africa and Arabia. The subspecies vociferus is found east of this range across South Asia and into Southeast Asia. Along Sumatra, Java, Borneo and the Philippines subspecies hypoleucus (sometimes considered a full species) includes the population wahgiensis described from New Guinea. The subspecies sumatranus is not always recognized. The white-tailed kite and the black-shouldered kite were formerly included with this species but have since been treated as separate species.

Although found mainly on the plains they have been seen at higher altitudes in Sikkim (3,650 m (11,980 ft)), the Nilgiris (Doddabetta, 2,670 m (8,760 ft)) and Nagaland (2,020 m (6,630 ft)).

They are said to be winter visitors in some parts of their range such as the Western Ghats.

== Behaviour and ecology ==
The black-winged kite breeds at different times of the year across its range. Although nesting has been noted throughout the year in India, they appear not to breed in April and May. Males establish territories and defend them from competition. Females move into the territories of males. Studies in Africa found that males were more numerous than females. Courtship is noisy and involves chases and once the pair is formed they copulate frequently. The nest is a loose platform of twigs in which 3 or 4 eggs are laid. The female spends more effort in the construction of the nest than the male. The eggs are pale creamy with spots of deep red. Both parents incubate but when the chicks hatch, the male spends more time on foraging for food. Females initially feed the young, sometimes hunting close to the nest but will also receive food from the male. After fledging the young birds continue to be dependent for food on the male parent for about 80 days, initially transferring food at perch and later in the air. Young birds have reddish brown feathers on the upperparts and on the breast. The reddish colour is derived from porphyrins and is thought to provide the young birds some camouflage. Once breeding is complete females often move on to new territories sometimes deserting before the young fledge, leaving males to feed and raise the young. Both males and females show considerable nomadism. Unlike most birds of prey, they are capable of raising multiple broods in a year, and young birds are known to disperse widely, adaptations that helps them utilize periodic rodent population surges. Their opportunistic breeding capabilities are also accompanied by irregular patterns of moult. Young birds show "arrested" moult, retaining feathers for a season and then rapidly moulting them in a serial descendent pattern, where more than one primary feather is moulted at the same time. The adult plumage is found after two years.

Their prey includes grasshoppers, crickets and other large insects, lizards, and rodents. Injured birds, small snakes and frogs have also been reported. The black-winged kite flies slowly during hunting like a harrier, but it will also hover like a kestrel. It has on rare occasions been known to hunt prey in flight. Perches are used for hunting and for feeding but large prey may sometimes be handled on the ground. In southern Africa, they appear to favour roadside verges for foraging and are sometimes killed by collisions with vehicles.

These birds roost communally with groups of 15 to 35 (larger numbers in Europe) converging at a large leafy tree. They are extremely silent and the calls recorded include a high-pitched squeal or a soft whistle. They call mainly during the breeding season and at the roost site. A species of nematode, Physaloptera acuticauda, has been recorded as a parasite of the species in South Africa. A trematode species, Neodiplostomum elani, has been described from a black-winged kite type host from Chandigarh. A feather louse Degeeriella elani is known from the species.

The soft feathers of black-winged kites can lead to adherence with some grass seeds which may be dispersed by the species. However such seeds can pose the risk of entangling their wings.

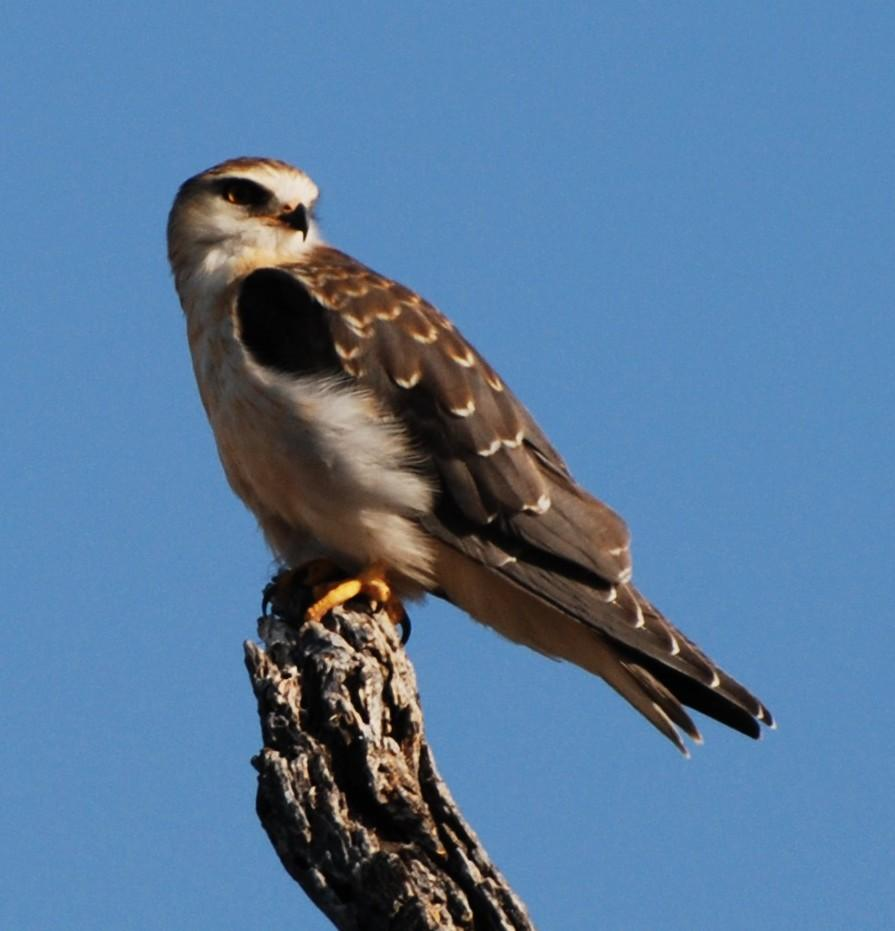
Immature E. c. caeruleus from Namibia. The iris is dark in young birds.

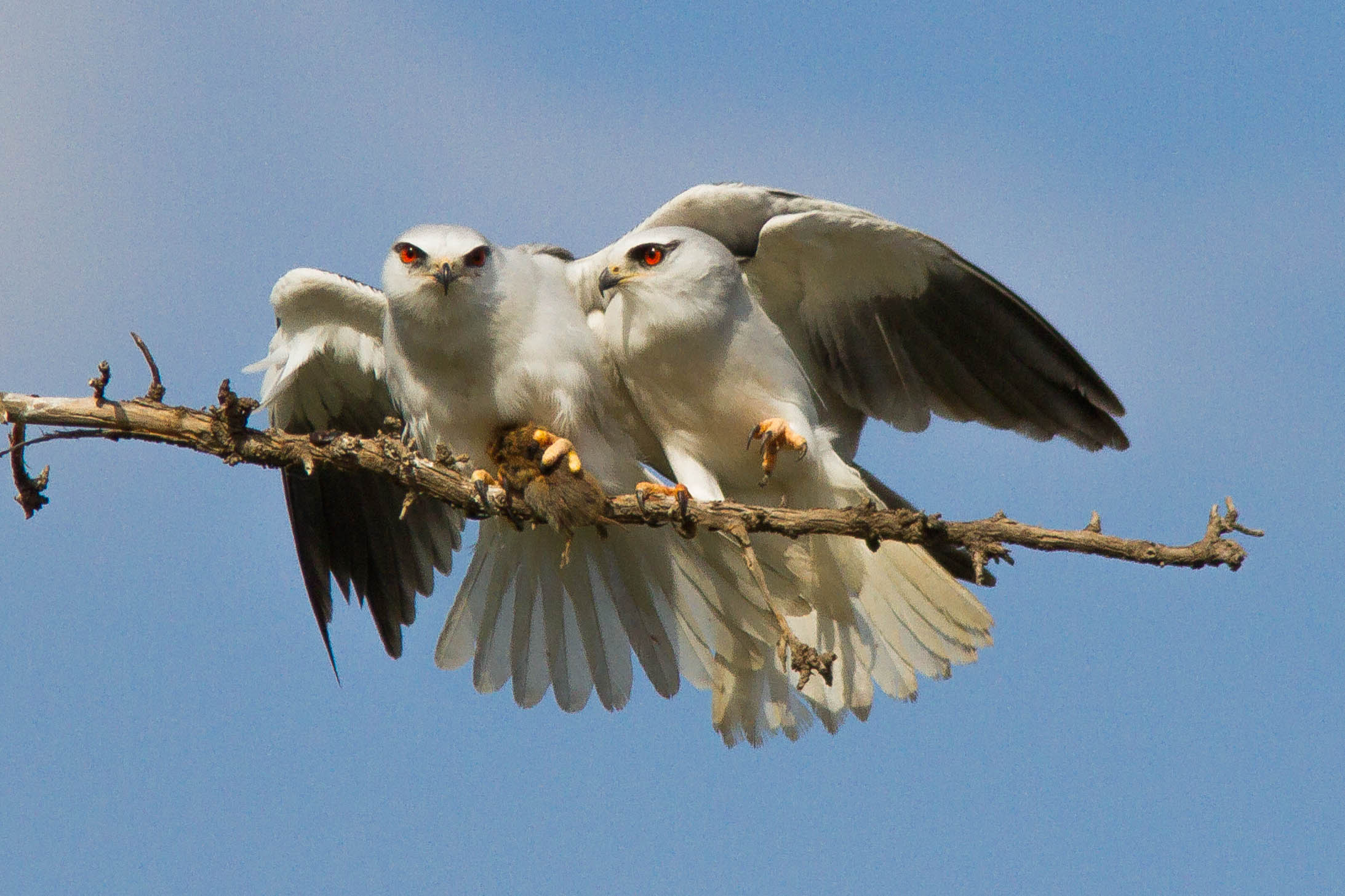
A courting pair (E. c. vociferus) with a rodent

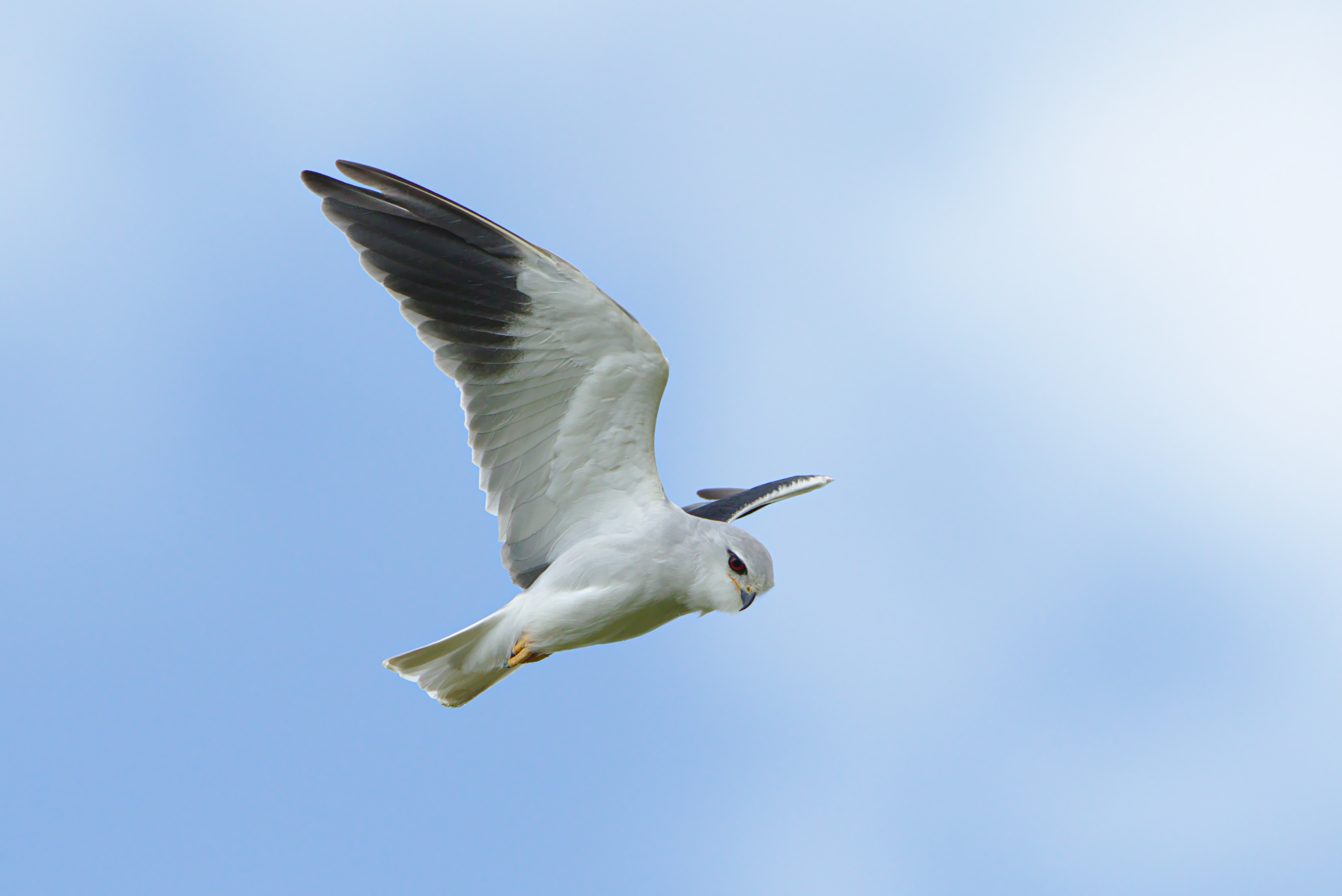
E. c. caeruleus hovering with whitish underside of the secondaries visible

Calls

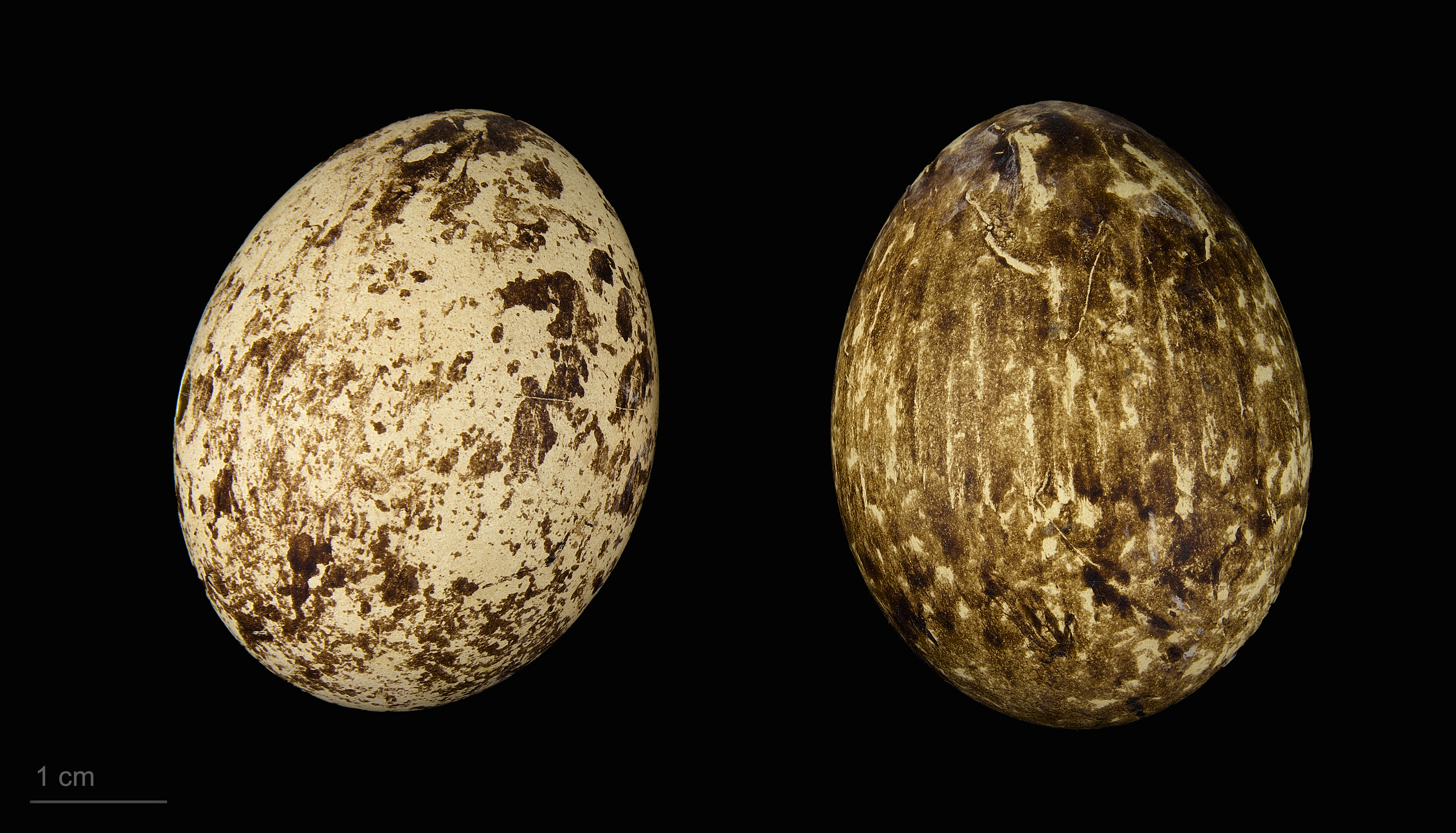
Eggs

== Other sources ==
- Hume, A.O. (1872). "On the breeding of Elanus Melanopterus". Stray Feathers. 1 (1): 21–26.
- Hodgson, B.H. (1837). "On the structure and habits of the Elanus melanopterus". Madras Journal of Literature and Science. 6: 75–78.
- Goriup, P.D. (1981). "Observations on a pair of Black-winged Kites (Elanus cueruleus) in eastern Portugal". Arquivos Museu Bocage. 1: 65–79.
- Naoroji, Rishad (1986). "Communal gathering of Blackwinged Kites (Elanus caeruleus vociferus)". Journal of the Bombay Natural History Society. 83 (Supp): 200–201.
- Harris, T.; Walters, C. (1982). "Chromosomal sexing of the Black Shouldered Kite (Elanus caeruleus) (Aves: Accipitridae)". Genetica. 60 (1): 19–20. doi:10.1007/BF00121451. S2CID 29310017.
