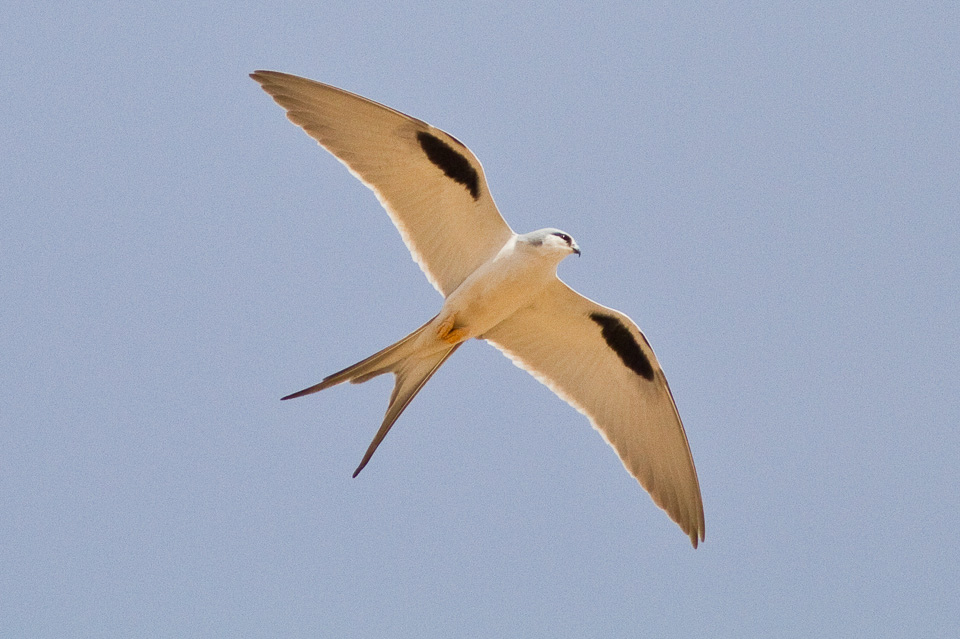
- Flying in Far North Region, Cameroon

Conservation status
- Vulnerable (IUCN 3.1)

Scientific classification
- Kingdom: Animalia
- Phylum: Chordata
- Class: Aves
- Order: Accipitriformes
- Family: Accipitridae
- Genus: Chelictinia; Lesson, 1843
- Species: C. riocourii

Binomial name
- Chelictinia riocourii (Temminck, 1821)

Synonyms
- Elanoïdes riocouri Vieillot, 1823?; Falco riocour Temminck, 1824; Elanus riocouri Vigors, 1824; Nauclerus riocouri Vigors 1825; Nauclerus africanus Swainson, 1837; Chelidopteryx riocourii Kaup, 1845

= Scissor-tailed kite =

Species of bird

The scissor-tailed kite (Chelictinia riocourii), also known commonly as the African swallow-tailed kite and the fork-tailed kite, is a bird of prey in the family Accipitridae. It is the only species placed in the genus Chelictinia. It is widespread in the northern tropics of Africa.

== Taxonomy and systematics ==
The scissor-tailed kite was illustrated in 1821 for a work by the Dutch zoologist Coenraad Temminck. The hand-coloured plate formed part of livraison 15 of Temminck's work. The binomial name Falco riocourii was printed on the wrapper to the livraison, but not included on the plate itself. The text that accompanied the plate in the final bound volume was not published until December 1823, after the species had been described and illustrated in 1822 by the French ornithologist Louis Pierre Vieillot. The scissor-tailed kite was grouped with the Elanus kites or with the larger American swallow-tailed kite, but in 1843 the French naturalist René Lesson assigned it to a separate genus, Chelictinia. The genus name Chelictinia is possibly derived from Greek χελιδών or χελιδονι (chelidon), meaning swallow, with ικτινοσ (iktinos), meaning kite. The specific epithet riocourii honours the Count Rioucour, Antoine François du Bois "first president in the Royal Court of Nancy, and possessor of a beautiful collection of birds". However, some sources refer to his son, Antoine Nicolas François, who was a contemporary of Vieillot. The species is monotypic: no subspecies are recognised. A molecular phylogenetic study of the Accipitridae published in 2024 found that the scissor-tailed kite is sister to the kites in the genus Elanus.

== Description ==
It weighs 160–427 grams with a wingspan of 84–89 cm. The scissor-tailed kite is a small, slim grey and white kite with a relatively weak bill, a broad head, long pointed wings and a deeply forked tail. The adults are generally pale grey above and white below, with a white forehead and a black patch around the eyes. In flight the dark greyish flight feathers contrast with the inner underwing edges, there is also an obvious black bar across the carpal. Juveniles are darker on the back with rufous edges to the feathers and creamier below. It has a distinctive almost tern like flight and frequently hovers into the wind like a kestrel. The red eyes of the adult are also a distinctive feature.

== Distribution and habitat ==
The species inhabits the arid savannah of the Sahel region of Africa, occurring mainly in a band between 8° and 15° N that stretches from Senegal on the west coast to Sudan in the east. There are also populations breeding in Ethiopia and Kenya."

It is found in many countries, including: Benin, Burkina Faso, Cameroon, Central African Republic, Chad, Ivory Coast, Djibouti, Eritrea, Ethiopia, Gambia, Ghana, Kenya, Liberia, Mali, Mauritania, Niger, Nigeria, Senegal, Somalia, Sudan, Togo, Uganda, and is also found in Yemen.

== Behaviour and ecology ==
When breeding the scissor-tailed kite feeds mainly on skinks and other lizards, as well as small snakes, rodents and arthropods. Usually hunts on the wing, occasionally pursuing insects flushed by grass fires. When termites emerge or locusts swarm, there may be gatherings of scissor-tailed kites. Loose flocks have been known to associate with cattle, flying immediately overhead and hawking any insects that they flush.

They breed in loose colonies of up to 20 pairs, although will do so as single pairs, mainly from May to August but breeds in December to February in the west and March- June or August in Kenya. A small stick nest is built in an acacia or thorny bush at 2-8m from the ground. The nest is often sited close to the nest of a large raptor such as a secretary bird or a brown snake eagle, occasionally close to buildings.

== Status ==
The species is vulnerable to degradation of the habitat and pesticides. However, populations seem to be locally common in spite of decline in some parts of the range.
