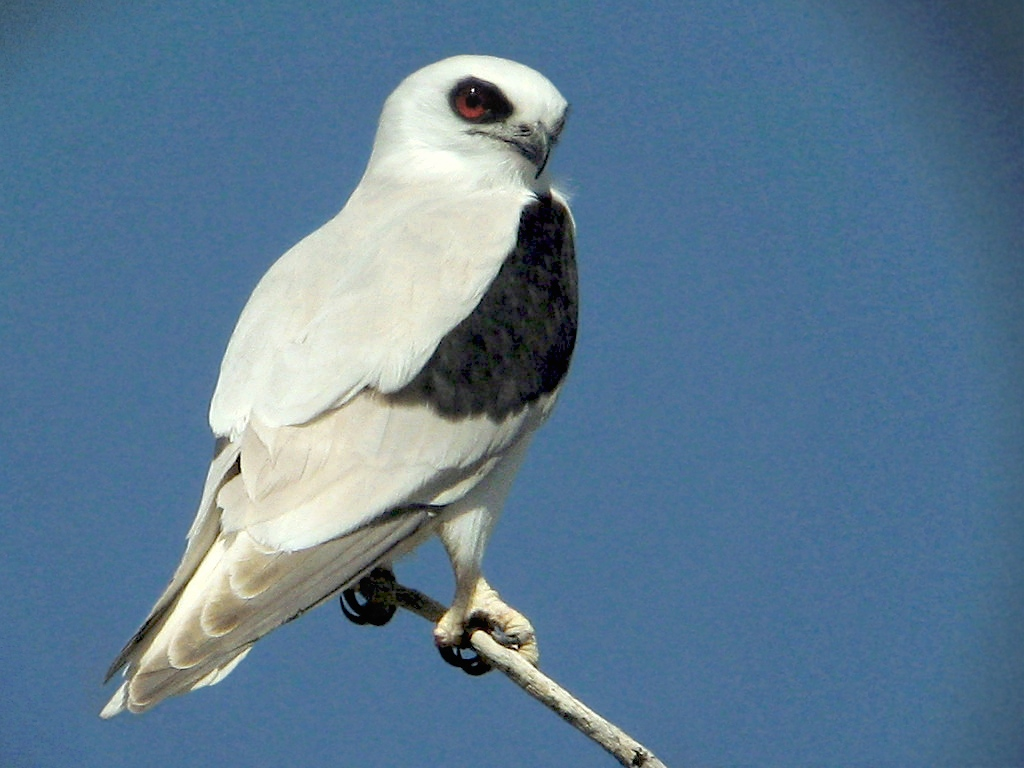

Conservation status
- Near Threatened (IUCN 3.1)

Scientific classification
- Kingdom: Animalia
- Phylum: Chordata
- Class: Aves
- Order: Accipitriformes
- Family: Accipitridae
- Genus: Elanus
- Species: E. scriptus

Binomial name
- Elanus scriptus Gould, 1842
- Range of the letter-winged kite (2007)

= Letter-winged kite =

Raptor native to Australia

The letter-winged kite (Elanus scriptus) is a small, rare and irruptive bird of prey that is found only in Australia. Measuring around 35 cm (14 in) in length with a wingspan of 84–100 cm (33–39 in), the adult letter-winged kite has predominantly pale grey and white plumage and prominent black rings around its red eyes. Its name derives from its highly distinctive black underwing pattern of a shallow 'M' or 'W' shape, visible when in flight. This distinguishes it from the otherwise similar black-shouldered kite. This species is also the only nocturnal species within the order Accipitriformes despite few differences found in its visual anatomy to other closely related kites.

The species begins breeding in response to rodent outbreaks, with pairs nesting in loose colonies of up to 50 birds each. Three to four eggs are laid and incubated for around thirty days, though the eggs may be abandoned if the food source disappears. Chicks are fledged within five weeks of hatching. Roosting in well-foliaged trees during the day, the letter-winged kite hunts mostly at night. It is a specialist predator of rodents, which it hunts by hovering above grasslands and fields. It is rated as near threatened on the International Union for Conservation of Nature (IUCN)'s Red List of Threatened Species.

== Taxonomy ==
The letter-winged kite was described by ornithologist John Gould in 1842 under its current binomial name Elanus scriptus. The specific epithet is from the Latin word scriptum, meaning "written" or "marked". British explorer Charles Sturt wrote of seeing them on his travels in his 1849 book Narrative of an Expedition into Central Australia. The letter-winged kite is monotypic: no subspecies are recognised, nor is there any recorded geographic variation. Molecular evidence shows that the letter-winged kite and its relatives belong to the subfamily Elaninae, an early offshoot within the raptor family Accipitridae. There is some evidence that they may be more divergent from other raptors and better placed in their own family.

"Letter-winged kite" has been designated as the official English-language name by the International Ornithologists' Union (IOU), derived from the letter-like markings under the wings. In Central Australia, southwest of Alice Springs, the Pitjantjatjara name for the letter-winged kite is nyanyitjira. It has been incorrectly called white-breasted sparrowhawk.

== Description ==
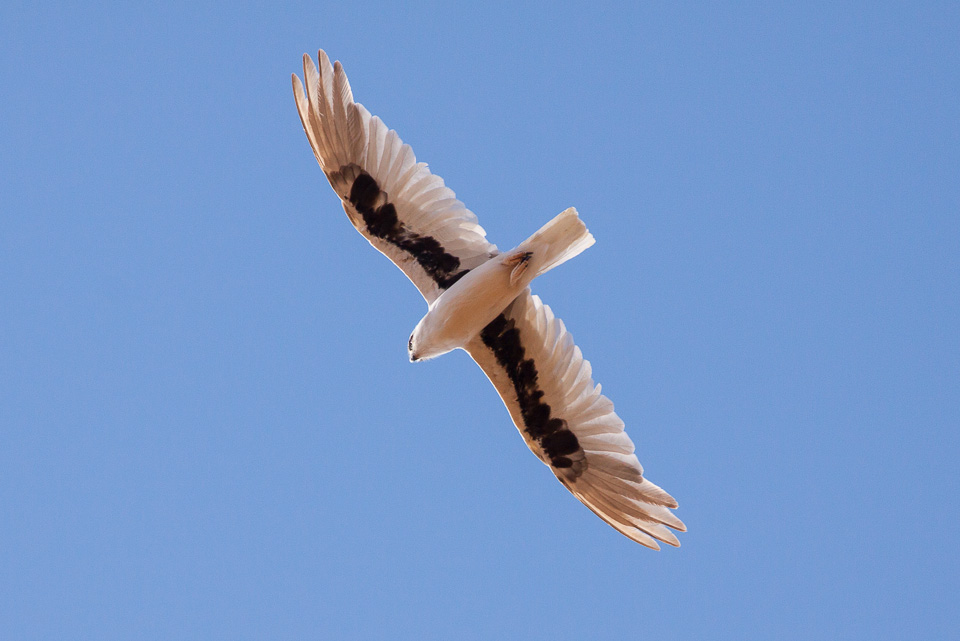
A letter-winged kite in flight, Birdsville Track, South Australia. The underwing markings are visible.

The adult letter-winged kite is about 35 cm (14 in) in length, with a wingspan between 84 and 100 cm (33 and 39 in). The female is slightly heavier, averaging 310 g (11 oz) compared to the male's average weight of 260 g (9.2 oz). The sexes have similar plumage. The adult male has pale grey upperparts, wings and nape with a white head and white underparts. It has large deep-red eyes, which are surrounded by a black eye patch. Its bill is black, with a dark grey-brown cere at its base. Its wings are marked with a black shoulder patch above and a striking black line underneath, which runs from the primary coverts to the body, and which resembles a letter 'M' or 'W' when flying. The central rectrices of the tail are pale grey, while the rest of the tail feathers are white. The legs and feet are a fleshy pinkish white or white. The feet have three toes facing forwards and one toe facing backwards. The female is similar but can be distinguished by a greyer crown, and its grey plumage is slightly darker all over. Moulting has been recorded from all months except May and August, and is probably related to breeding.

The juvenile has a white lower forehead, face, chin and throat, with a brownish orange band across the forehead, neck and breast. It has a similar dark eye patch to the adult, and the eyes themselves are dark brown. The hindneck is grey-brown, and the upperpart feathers are grey-brown with orange tips. The rump and central tail rectrices are pale grey tipped with orange. The bill is black with a brownish grey cere.

The letter-winged kite soars with v-shaped upcurved wings, the primaries slightly spread and the tail fanned, giving it a square appearance. When flying actively, it beats its wings more slowly and deeply than the black-shouldered kite (Elanus axillaris). The wing beats are interspersed with long glides on angled wings. It can also hover motionless facing into the wind and flapping its wings. The 'M' or 'W' on the underside of its wing and lack of black wing tips help distinguish it from the black-shouldered kite. Additionally, the latter species is diurnal, not nocturnal. At night, the letter-winged kite could be mistaken for the eastern barn owl (Tyto javanica) or eastern grass owl (T. longimembris), but these species have large heads; longer and trailing legs; blunted wings; and stockier bodies. The grey falcon (Falco hypoleucos) has somewhat similar colouration to the letter-winged kite but is bulkier and heavier overall, and lacks the black markings.

=== Vocalisations ===
The letter-winged kite is generally silent when alone but often noisy when breeding or roosting communally at night, beginning to call at the rising of the moon. Its calls have been described as chicken-like chirping or a repeated loud kacking, and at times resemble those of the barn owl or black-shouldered kite. A rasping call, or scrape, composed of six or seven half-second long notes is the main contact call between a pair. It is often used by the female in answer to a whistle by her mate, when a bird alights at the nest, or—loudly—in response to an intruder. The male can utter a loud whistle in flight, which can serve as an alarm call. Mated pairs chatter to one another at night in the colony.

== Distribution and habitat ==
The usual habitat of the letter-winged kite is arid and semi-arid open, shrubby or grassy country, across the arid interior of the continent, particularly the southern Northern Territory, particularly the Barkly Tableland, and northeastern South Australia, and Queensland, where it is relatively common in western areas south of 20° south, and has been recorded as far afield as Townsville and Stradbroke Island. In South Australia it may reach the Eyre Peninsula and southeastern corner on occasion. The species is generally rare in New South Wales: it has been recorded in the vicinity of Broken Hill in the far west, and twice in Inverell in the north of the state—once found dead in a street in 1965 and once spotted alive a year later. It is rare in Western Australia.

Its abundance or even presence in any given area is heavily dependent on availability of food; spells of significant rainfall inland lead to surges in rodent numbers, which in turn lead to irruptions of letter-winged kites. Nesting and raising multiple broods in succession, the kite population may increase ten-fold. Major irruptions have taken place in 1951–53, 1969–70, 1976–77, and 1993–95. Eventually dry conditions lead to a fall in rodent numbers and dispersal of birds, which often starve if they fail to find prey elsewhere.

== Behaviour ==
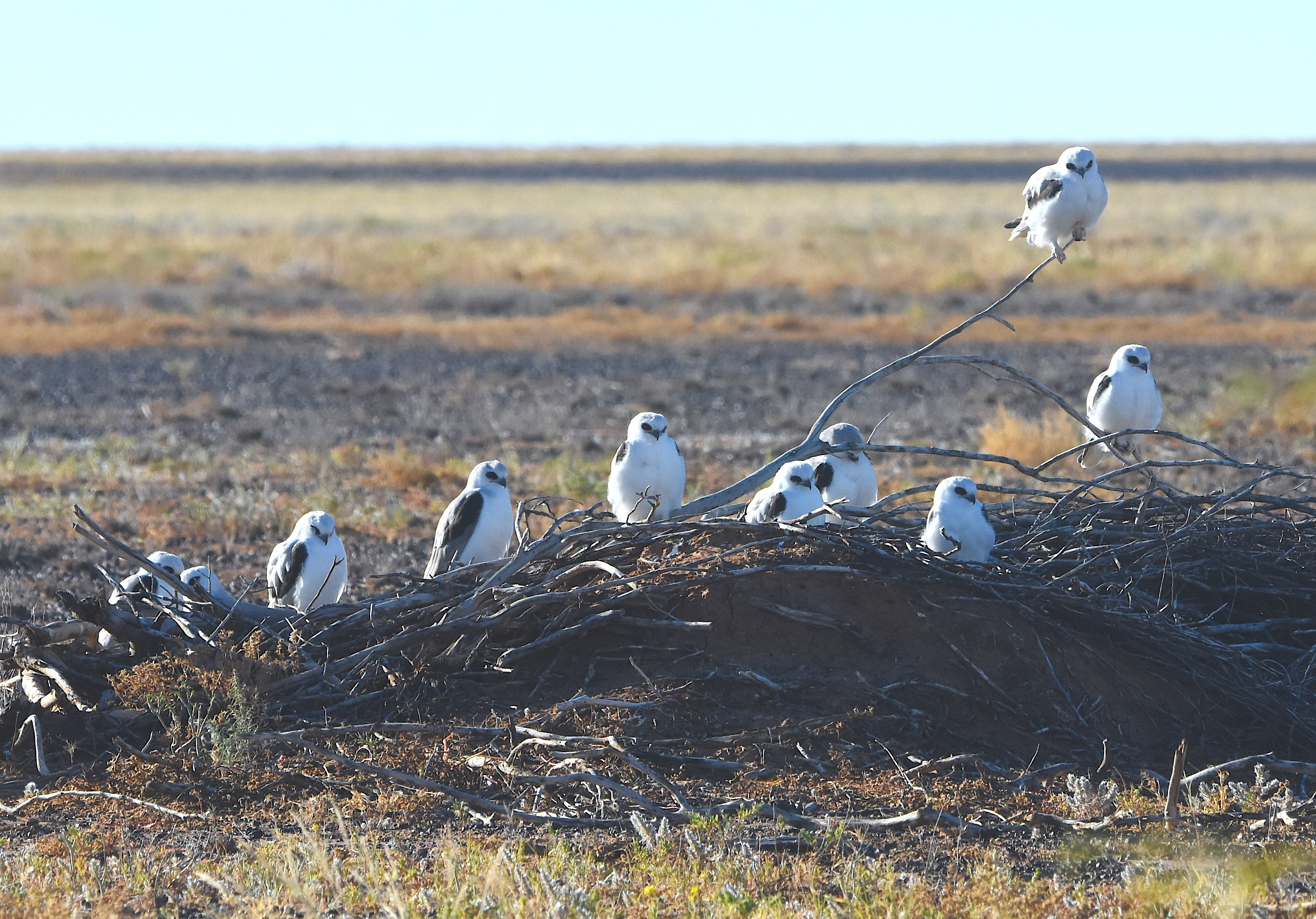
Roosting in Diamantina basin, Queensland

The letter-winged kite typically hunts at night, with daytime foraging taking place in areas of superabundant or scarce prey. By day, birds roost in leafy trees with plenty of cover, in colonies of up to 400 individuals, becoming active at dusk. Their social behaviour is poorly known on account of their nocturnal habits and shy nature, being difficult to approach when roosting.

=== Breeding ===
Within its range, the letter-winged kite generally breeds in an area covering the Diamantina and Lake Eyre drainage basins, Sturt Stony Desert, eastern Simpson Desert and Barkly Tableland, to Richmond, Queensland, and Banka Banka Station in the north and Boolkarie Creek, South Australia, in the south. Nesting has also been recorded in Exmouth Gulf and southwest Western Australia, the southwest of the Northern Territory, and the Clarence River district and northwest of New South Wales. The birds nest in colonies of up to 50 pairs, and have more than one nest and brood at once. At times their nests are close to those of spotted harriers (Circus assimilis), black kites (Milvus migrans), whistling kites (Haliastur sphenurus), brown falcons (Falco berigora) and black falcons (Falco subniger).

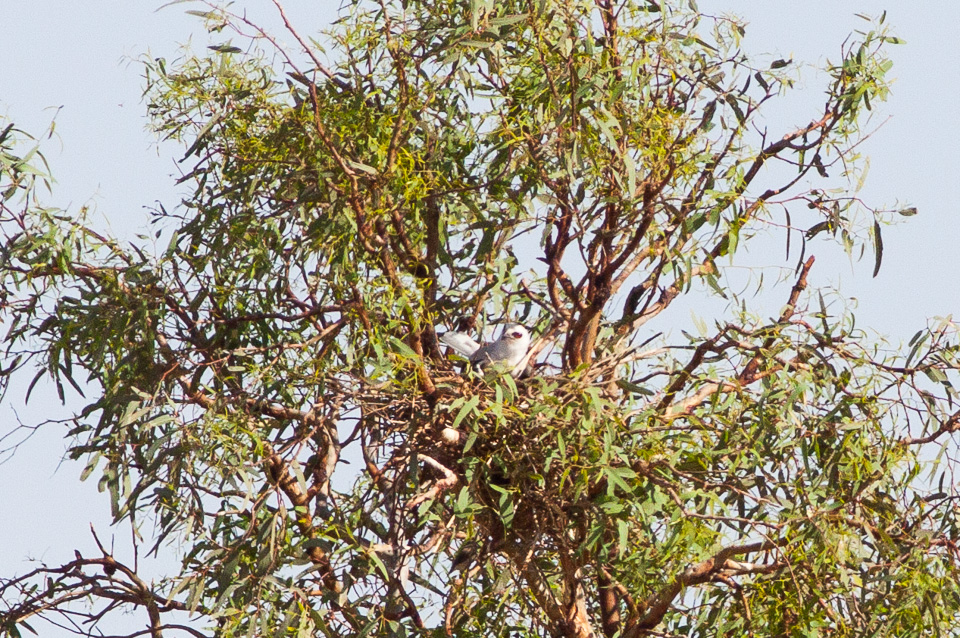
On a nest in foliage in Birdsville Track, South Australia

It is not known if breeding pairs remain bonded after breeding. Aerial courtship displays involve mutual flight high above the nest, with the male flying much higher than the female and holding its wings high with rapidly fluttering wingtips. He drops near its mate, who responds by holding her wings in a similar manner. The two then chatter while circling each other. Copulation often follows.

There does not appear to be a set breeding season; instead, the species forms nesting colonies in response to rodent irruptions. Birds produce broods for as long as the rodents are abundant, and stop when their food source declines. Often smaller trees are chosen as nesting sites over larger ones, with some preference given to the beefwood (Grevillea striata). Other species used include waddy (Acacia peuce), coolibah (Eucalyptus microtheca) and sheoaks (Casuarina spp.). Generally there is one nest per tree, though there may be more than one nest in single trees when rodent irruptions provide an abundance of food. The nest is a large, untidy and shallow cup of sticks, usually located in the foliage near the top of trees, some five metres (15 ft) or higher off the ground. On average it is about 50 cm (20 in) wide and 34 cm (13 in) high, with a 20 cm (8 in) diameter cup-shaped depression within. It is lined with green leaves and other material such as regurgitated pellets.

The clutch consists of three to four, or rarely five or even six, dull white eggs measuring on average 44 mm × 32 mm (1.7 in × 1.3 in) with red-brown blotches and tapered oval in shape. The markings are often heavier around the larger end of the egg. The female incubates the eggs for 30 days, though this has been difficult to confirm due to unpredictable breeding. The young are born semi-altricial, covered in white down with black beaks and feet and dark brown eyes. By a week old, they have pale tan down on their back and brown eyes. They are fully feathered by 3–4 weeks of age and can fly at 7 weeks. During this time they are brooded by the female, while the male brings food at night. He calls on his approach, at which the female flies out to receive the food and then convey it to the young. Though not known to feed the young himself, the male may at times bring food to the female on the nest. As the brood grows, the female joins the male in catching food; she may eventually begin a second brood and leave the male to feed the older brood. Nestlings fledge at around 32 days, although have been known to be abandoned if the food supply suddenly disappears. Birds in juvenile plumage reach sexual maturity within their first year of age.

=== Food and hunting ===
The letter-winged kite hunts mainly in the first two hours after sunset. It flies at a height of 10 to 20 m (35 to 65 ft), moving in wide circles scanning the ground, then hovers at a height of up to 30 m (100 ft). When prey is spotted, the kite drops silently onto it, feet-first with wings raised high.

The letter-winged kite's principal prey is the long-haired rat (Rattus villosissimus). When population numbers of this rodent build up, following significant rainfall, the kites are able to breed continuously and colonially so that their numbers increase in parallel. One Central Australian study over two and a half years found that, within six months of an outbreak starting, the birds had relocated to that location. When the rodent populations decline, the now superabundant kites may disperse and appear in coastal areas far from their normal range; though they may occasionally breed in these new locations, they do not persist and eventually disappear.

Across Central Australia, the letter-winged kite shares its habitat with other nocturnal rodent hunters, the eastern barn owl and eastern grass owl; the former species prefers larger rodents such as the plains rat (Pseudomys australis), whereas the kite hunts all species, including the sandy inland mouse (Pseudomys hermannsburgensis) and spinifex hopping mouse (Notomys alexis), on availability. Other predators sharing its habitat and prey include the dingo, feral cat and fox. Overall, letter-winged kites average one rodent consumed per day. They have also been recorded hunting the introduced house mouse (Mus musculus) in north-eastern South Australia. Other animals recorded as prey include rabbit, fat-tailed dunnart (Sminthopsis crassicaudata), stripe-faced dunnart (Sminthopsis macroura), Forrest's mouse (Leggadina forresti ), beetles and spur‐throated locust (Nomadacris guttulosa).

While traditionally considered a rodent specialist, Letter-winged kites will also eat birds such as Australian pratincole during population booms of those species.

=== Predation ===
Black falcons have been reported hunting adult letter-winged kites, while black kites have taken nestlings.

== Conservation status ==
The letter-winged kite's fluctuations in abundance make its conservation status difficult to assess, though it is clearly much less common than the black-shouldered kite. It also rarely comes into contact with people across most of its range. It is rated as near threatened on the International Union for Conservation of Nature (IUCN) Red List of Threatened Species, as its population may number as low as 1,000 individuals between irruptions. It is unknown to what extent competition for food with the introduced red fox or feral cat, or if habitat degraded by overgrazing, have an impact on the letter-winged kite. It is not known whether the population has increased or decreased overall since European settlement.
