= Nauclerus (bird) =

Scientific classification
- Kingdom: Animalia
- Phylum: Chordata
- Class: Aves
- Order: Accipitriformes
- Family: Accipitridae
- Genus: Nauclerus; Vigors, 1825

Species
- N. riocourii (Chelictinia riocourii); N. furcatus (Elanoides forficatus)

Former genus of birds

Nauclerus is an obsolete genus of birds of prey, containing the swallow-tailed and scissor-tailed kites. Though similar, the two species are not closely related, belonging to separate subfamilies, namely Perninae and Elaninae, respectively.

The term is preserved in the modern French common names "élanion naucler" and "naucler à queue fourchue".

== Taxonomy ==
The name Nauclerus was published by Nicholas Aylward Vigors in 1825, and used by other authors in the 19th century.

Vigors' original description contained both the swallow-tailed kite (N. furcatus, also called the Carolina kite (Note: The French ornithologists called them milans (kites): the American specimens were milan de la Carolines and milan du Paraguay, and the African species was milan Riocour (in honour of the Comte du Riocour). Elanus was called the couhyer, from its Egyptian name, kouhyeh.) or forked-tail hawk) and the then-recently discovered scissor-tailed kite (Riocour's kite, N. Riocourii), separating them from the Elanus of Savigny.

In contrast, Vieillot had earlier published the genus Elanoïdes in 1818, containing E. furcatus and E. (f.) yetapa. Falco riocourii was not known until a few years later: illustrated in 1821 for a work by Temminck, (Note: Temminck's accompanying text was not published until 1824, but the illustrations were issued earlier in separate groups.) and described in 1822 by Vieillot. In 1823, Vieillot grouped all of the known elanine kites in Elanoïdes: E. furcatus (forficatus), E. leucurus, E. yetapa, E. cæsius (cæruleus), and E. riocourii.

Lesson split the scissor-tailed kite into a separate genus as Chelictinia Riocourii in 1843, leaving N. furcatus as a junior synonym of Elanoïdes furcatus Vieillot, 1818.

An alternative approach is to consider N. riocourii the type species of Nauclerus, giving Nauclerus Vieillot 1825 precedence over Chelictinia Lesson 1843. The effect would be to keep riocourii in Nauclerus, and move furcatus to Elanoides.

== Description ==
Both species have deeply forked tails with slender bodies and long, pointed wings. The scales on their lower legs are reticulated, and the nails of their talons are not rounded underneath.

They spend much time on the wing, taking insects, amphibians and small reptiles from tree branches, and insects from the air.

In C. riocourii, the second primary flight feather is the longest. It is the smaller of the two, with light grey plumage and black patches under the bends of its wings. E. forficatus has the third feather longest; it is notably larger; and its coloration is strikingly pied, being charcoal above and white below.
