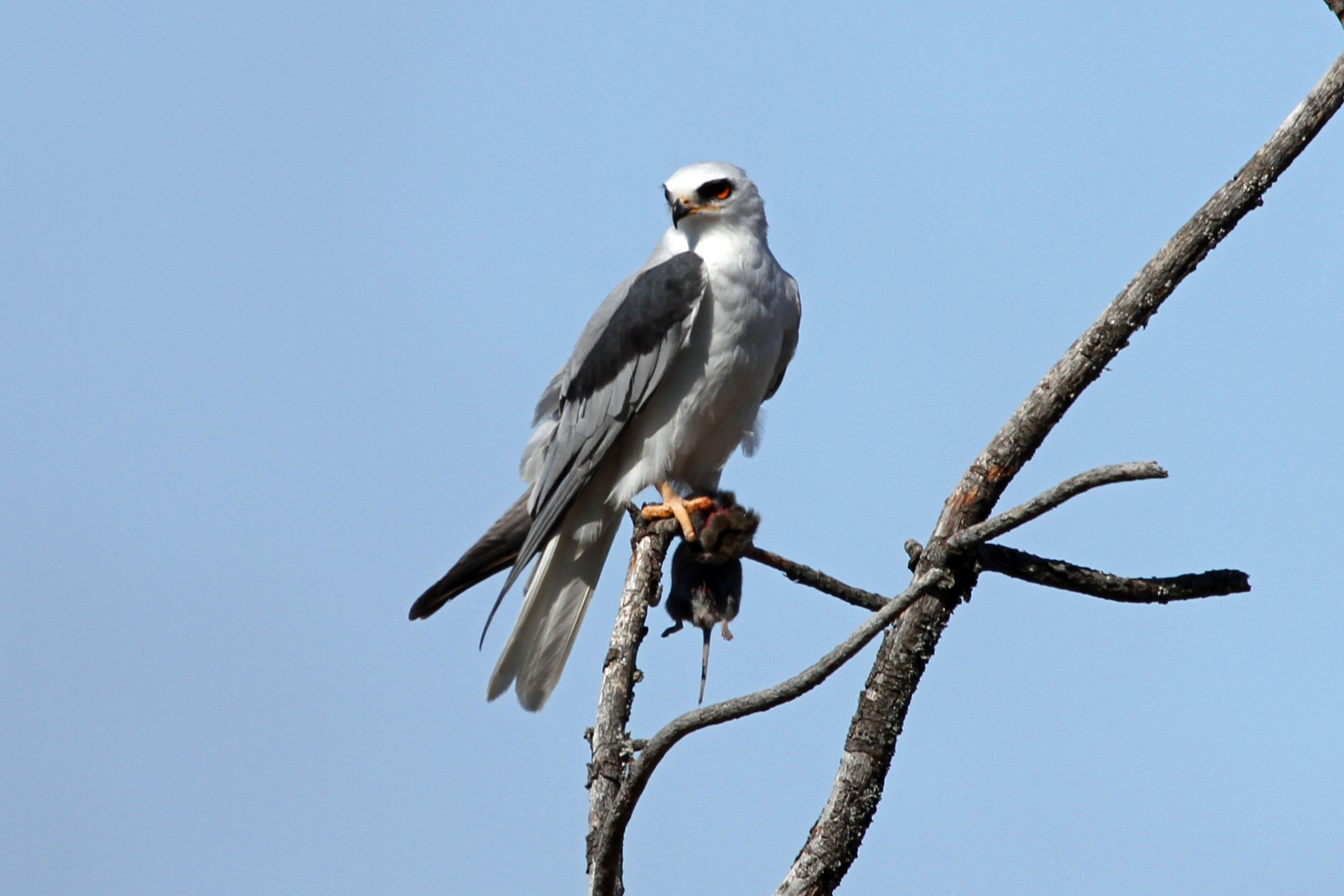
- White-tailed kite with prey.

Conservation status
- Least Concern (IUCN 3.1)

Scientific classification
- Kingdom: Animalia
- Phylum: Chordata
- Class: Aves
- Order: Accipitriformes
- Family: Accipitridae
- Genus: Elanus
- Species: E. leucurus

Binomial name
- Elanus leucurus (Vieillot, 1818)

Subspecies
- E. l. majusculus - Bangs & Penard, TE, 1920; E. l. leucurus - (Vieillot, 1818)

Synonyms
- Elanus caeruleus leucurus

= White-tailed kite =

Raptor native to the Americas

The white-tailed kite (Elanus leucurus) is a small raptor found in South America and parts of western North America. It replaces the related Old World black-winged kite in its native range.

== Taxonomy ==
The white-tailed kite was described in 1818 by French ornithologist Louis Pierre Vieillot under the binomial name Milvus leucurus, with the type locality as Paraguay. It is now one of four species in the genus Elanus, which was introduced in 1809 by French zoologist Jules-César Savigny. The word Elanus is from Ancient Greek elanos for a "kite". The specific epithet leucurus is from the Ancient Greek leukouros for "white-tailed": leukos is "white" and oura is "tail".

This species was grouped with the black-winged kite of Europe and Africa as Elanus caeruleus, which were collectively called black-shouldered kite.^{[4]} However, the American Ornithologists' Union accepted a more recent argument that the white-tailed kite differed from the Old World species in size, shape, plumage, and behavior, and that these differences were sufficient to warrant full species status.^{[5]} Thus, the white-tailed kite was returned to its original name. Meanwhile, the Old World E. caeruleus is once again called black-winged kite, while the name black-shouldered kite is now reserved for an Australian species, Elanus axillaris, which had also been lumped into E. caeruleus, but is now regarded as separate again.

== Description ==
The coloration of the white-tailed kite is gull-like, but its shape and flight are falcon-like, with a rounded tail. While it has white faces and white underparts, it has black wingtips, beaks, and shoulders. Contrastingly, the white-tailed kite has deep red eyes that stand out at night. A mid-sized kite, it measures 35–43 cm (14–17 in) in length, spans 88–102 cm (35–40 in) across the wings, and weighs 250–380 g (8.8–13.4 oz). Both the wings and tail are relatively elongated, and the tarsi measure around 3.6 cm (1.4 in).

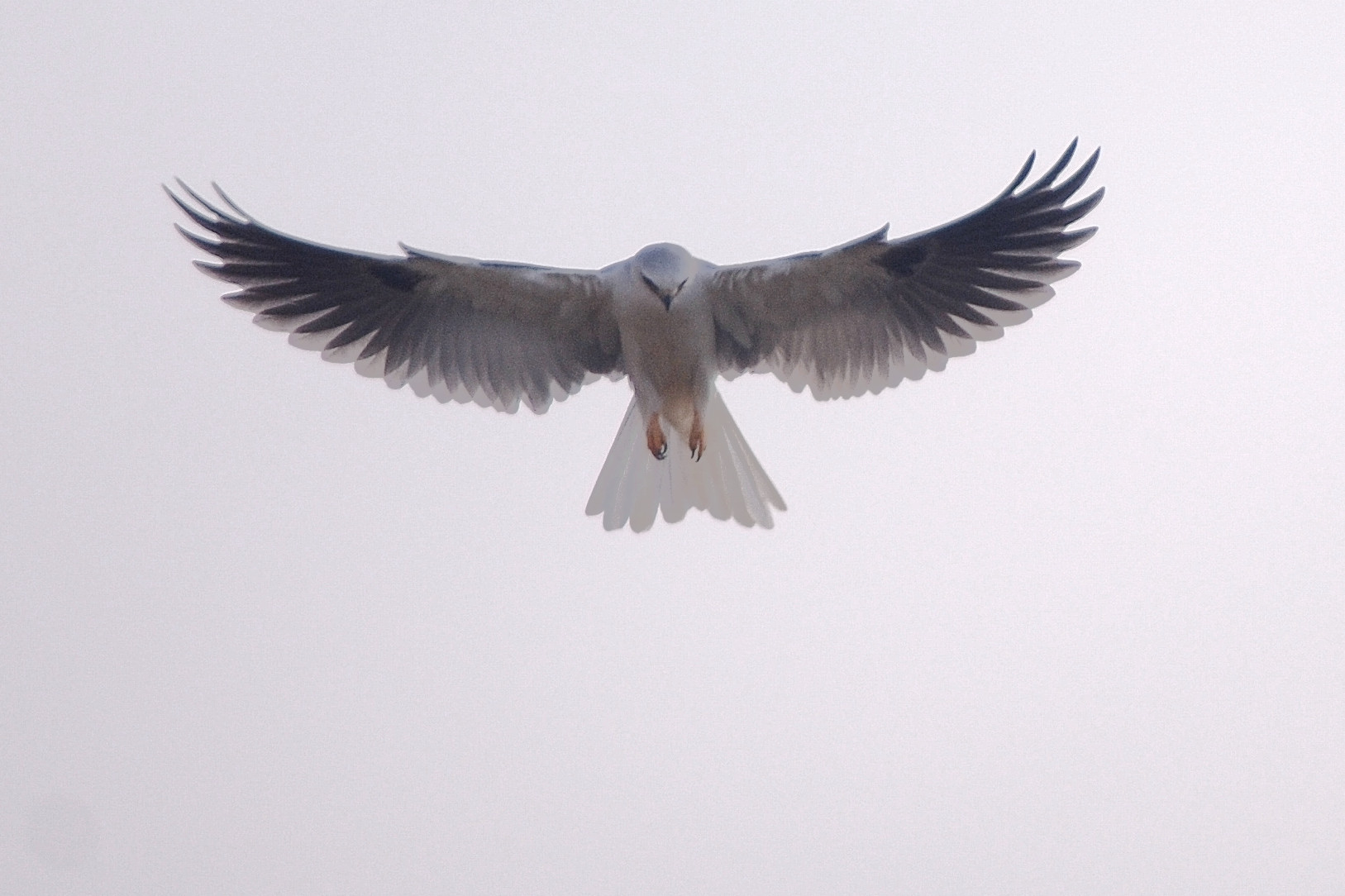
White-tailed kite hovering

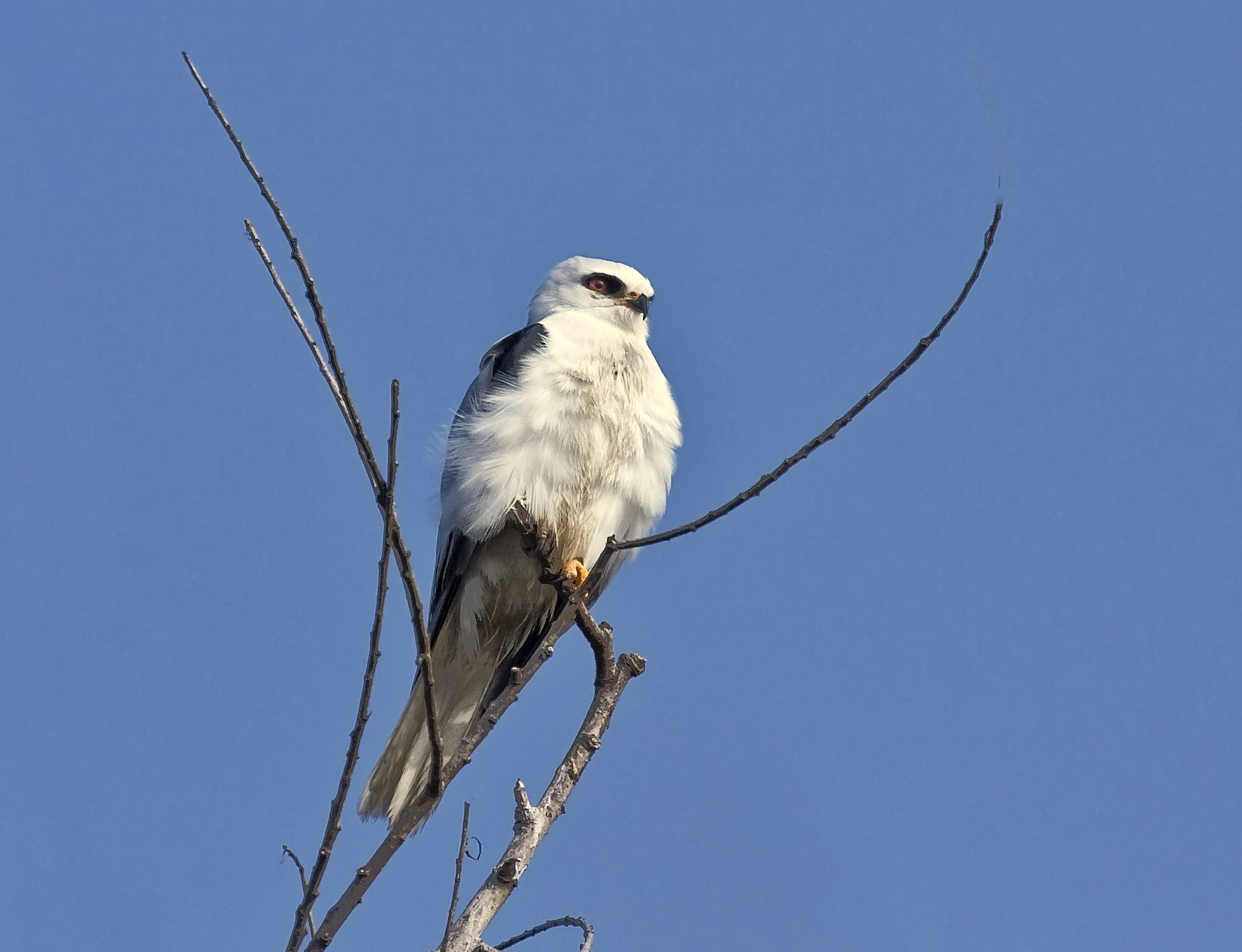
White-tailed kite roosting.

== Distribution and habitat ==
The white-tailed kite was rendered almost extinct in California in the 1930s and 1940s due to shooting and egg-collecting, but they are now common again, and their distribution is patchy. They can be found in Central Valley and southern coastal areas, open land around Goleta including the Ellwood Mesa Open Space, marshes in Humboldt County, and also around the San Francisco Bay. Elsewhere in California, they are still rare or absent. Although they are not migratory birds, they are also found from southern Texas and eastern Mexico to the Baja California Peninsula and through Central and South America to central Argentina and Chile. Globally, they are not considered threatened species by the IUCN. On rare occasions, the bird can be found far outside its usual range. At different times, two had been sighted in New England as of 2010. (Note: In August 2010, one was repeatedly seen at the mouth of the Housatonic River in Connecticut. "One of only two that we know of from New England", according to Frank Gallow, associate director of the Connecticut Audubon Society Coastal Center.)

White-tailed kites typically nest at the top of trees, usually around 20 to 50 feet above ground level. These nests can be in open-country trees growing in isolation or at the edge of or within a forest. Their nests are built from medium-sized sticks and twigs, grasses, weeds, hay, and moss and are measured about 21 inches across with a cup that is around 7 in across and 4 in deep.

== Behaviour ==
The white-tailed kite is famously known for "kiting", hovering in a position by facing into the wind and fluttering its wings. Although it may seem like irrelevant behavior at first, it does serve a purpose for hunting. While hovering around 80 feet in the air, it tips its head down to look for small mammals moving in the grass below. When prey is spotted, it dives down, quickly grabs the animal with its talons, and flies back up to eat.

White-tailed kites feed principally on rodents, small opossums, shrews, reptiles, amphibians, and large insects, and they are readily seen patrolling or hovering over lowland scrub or grassland. They rarely if ever eat other birds, and even in open cerrado, mixed-species feeding flocks generally ignore them. Most of the hunted insects are consumed on the wing while flying; instead of returning to a perch to feed, these birds transfer the prey from their talons to their beaks while flying to eat. In the case of larger prey such as rodents and lizards, they fly to a perch to pluck and eat.

Outside the breeding season during the winter, they roost, congregate or settle to rest at night, communally in groups of up to 100. However, once mating formally begins with the construction of nests by both males and females in mid-February, the female kite abstains from hunting for the time being and stays in the nest to incubate the eggs while the male brings food back to the nest for the female and children. This incubation period lasts around 26–32 days and they lay around 4 to 5 eggs at a time. Their eggs are cream-colored with splotches of light and dark brown. Once they have hatched, it takes them around 35–40 days to develop the proper feathers and start learning how to fly.

White-tailed kites have been observed in aerial combat at the margins of territories, locking talons in a behavior described as "grappling". This is most often done during mating season as an act of dominance when the male kite patrols the nest. They typically slash and peck at intruding birds until one of the birds backs down or falls.

== Threats ==
Their predators are primarily other birds such as red-tailed hawks, peregrine falcons, prairie falcons, and great horned owls. Smaller birds such as American crows, common ravens, and small to medium-sized carnivores prey on the eggs of white-tailed kites.

Deforestation and urban expansions have caused the number of white-tailed kites to decrease as they lose suitable habitat. Climate change also impacts the white-tailed kite population, as heat waves in the spring put young birds at risk as their bodies are not developed enough to properly regulate their body temperature and can die from dehydration.
