= Irruptive growth =

Population dynamics model characterized by sharp booms and busts

Irruptive growth is a pattern of sudden rapid growth in the population of an organism. Measured over time, it is studied in population ecology. Population cycles often display irruptive growth, but with a predictable pattern of subsequent decline. It is a phenomenon typically associated with r-strategist organisms, which seek to produce an increased quantity of offspring at the expense of reduced individual parental investment.

== Description ==
Irruptive growth occurs when a species reproduces rapidly. It is especially common in large herbivores, such as pronghorn or elk (red deer), which have high fecundity and delayed density-dependent effects on recruitment. All populations show logistic growth, but in species which exhibit irruptive growth this is especially rapid. Populations of some species initially show a lack of response to density-dependent factors that limit population size as it nears the carrying capacity of the environment. The exhibition of irruptive growth is dependent on a number of elements including resource availability, degree of both interspecific and intraspecific competition, and strength of predator-prey relationships. In ecosystems with more than one species feeding on a certain resource, the populations of certain species can irrupt in non-predictable ways depending upon the complex feedback mechanisms caused by competition. A species population may sometimes irrupt when predators are removed, or when favourable weather causes food supplies to rapidly increase.

Similar to white-tailed deer in North America, roe deer in Europe have shown similar fecundity even as the population density doubles three or four times. The deer are able to irrupt because the species is able to double its population yearly and populations show delayed response to density-dependent factors, in other words -the females remain just as fertile despite having lower body weights and other characteristics affiliated with overpopulation.

Irruptive growth patterns are also seen in mammal herbivores with a relatively small body size, or such creatures in Arctic ecosystems which are subject to population cycles. In cases where a single herbivore prey species is dominant in an ecosystem, there is likely to be a strong link with predator species which serves to control the population (see Lotka–Volterra equations). The populations of rabbits and house mice introduced Australia show irruptive growth, for example. A possible reason may be that after drought ends, they reproduce at a rapid rate while predator reproduction is still seasonal in occurrence. This allows for the population to explode and to be limited more by a return of dry conditions than by predators. Invasive species which can reproduce rapidly may show this pattern of growth because when a new area is being colonized predator species are often not present to limit growth, and there is little intraspecific and/or interspecific competition in early settlement of a location which means there is abundant resource availability.

== K-strategist and r-strategist species ==
Species that are r-strategist (species that evolve according to r-selection) are characterized by rapid development, early reproduction, small body size, and shorter lifespans, whereas K-strategist species (species that evolve according to K-selection) exhibit slow development, delayed reproduction, large body size, and longer lifespans.

Species that are r-strategist are more likely to exhibit irruptive growth than K-strategist species. r-selection leads to high productivity, while K-selection leads to high efficiency. Productivity refers to the number of offspring produced, whereas efficiency refers to the probability of survival of individual offspring.

The human species is K-strategist; that is, each mating pair has a small number of offspring, of which the majority will survive to adulthood and reach reproductive age. r-strategist species, such as some insects and most plants, have very large numbers of offspring, the majority of which will die before reaching physical maturity. If there is a change in their environment, more of these offspring may survive than is typical, leading to irruptive growth. Because K-strategist species have less offspring they are less likely to exhibit irruptive growth.

== See also ==
- Population growth
- Ecological overshoot
- Population planning
