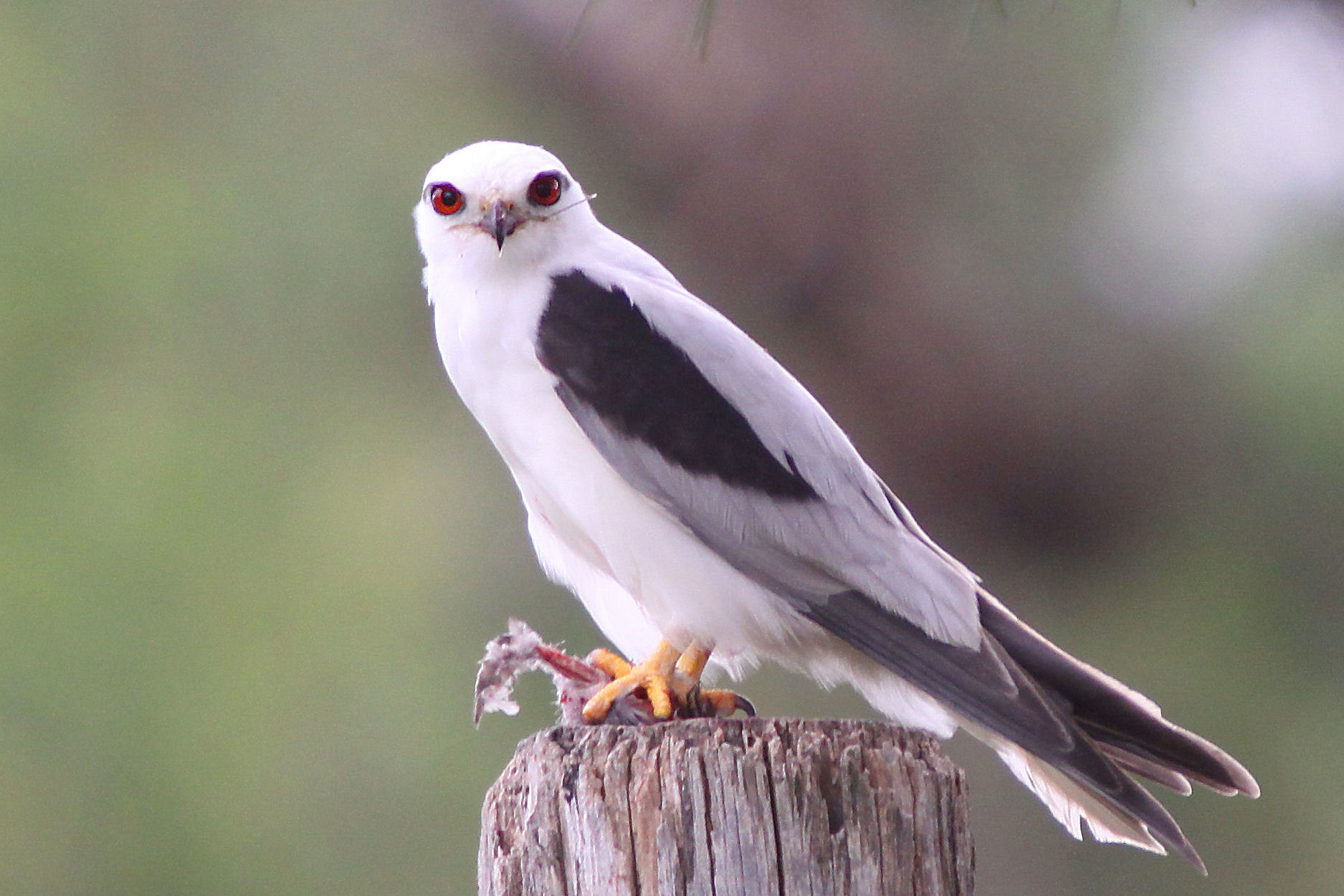
- Black-shouldered kite (Elanus axillaris)

Scientific classification
- Kingdom: Animalia
- Phylum: Chordata
- Class: Aves
- Order: Accipitriformes
- Family: Accipitridae
- Subfamily: Elaninae
- Genus: Elanus; Savigny, 1809

Type species
- Elanus caesius = Falco caeruleus Desfontaines 1789

= Elanus =

Genus of birds-of-prey

Elanus is a genus of birds of prey in the elanine kite subfamily of the family Accipitridae. The four species in the genus are widely distributed.

== Taxonomy ==
The genus Elanus was introduced in 1809 by French zoologist Jules-César Savigny to accommodate a single species, Falco caeruleus, the black-winged kite, that had been described in 1789 by René Louiche Desfontaines. This is now the type species of the genus by monotypy. The name is from the Ancient Greek elanos for a "kite".

== Description ==
These are white and grey raptors of open country, with black wing markings and short, square tails. They hunt by slowly quartering over mainly savanna habitat for rodents and other small mammals, birds, and insects, sometimes hovering like a kestrel. Their primary and secondary feathers have soft barbules from the upper surface that help in owl-like silent flight. The genus Elanus is distinctive in having very small scales covering the foot, and on the underside, scutellate scales are found only under the terminal phalanges. The claw lacks a groove on the underside. They also have eyesight suited for crepuscular rodent hunting. The genus contains four species, all of which hunt small mammals, especially rodents, by hovering in the air while looking for them in over open savanna habitats. For some time, these species were all included as subspecies of Elanus caeruleus, which has been known as the black-shouldered kite.

The letter-winged kite breeds colonially and is nocturnal. The other species are both diurnal and crepuscular.

Image	Common name	Scientific name (Note: A binomial authority in parentheses indicates that the species was originally described in a genus other than Elanus.)	Distribution
	Black-winged kite	E. caeruleus (Desfontaines, 1789)	
	Black-shouldered kite	E. axillaris (Latham, 1801)	
	White-tailed kite	E. leucurus (Vieillot, 1818)	
	Letter-winged kite	E. scriptus Gould, 1842	
