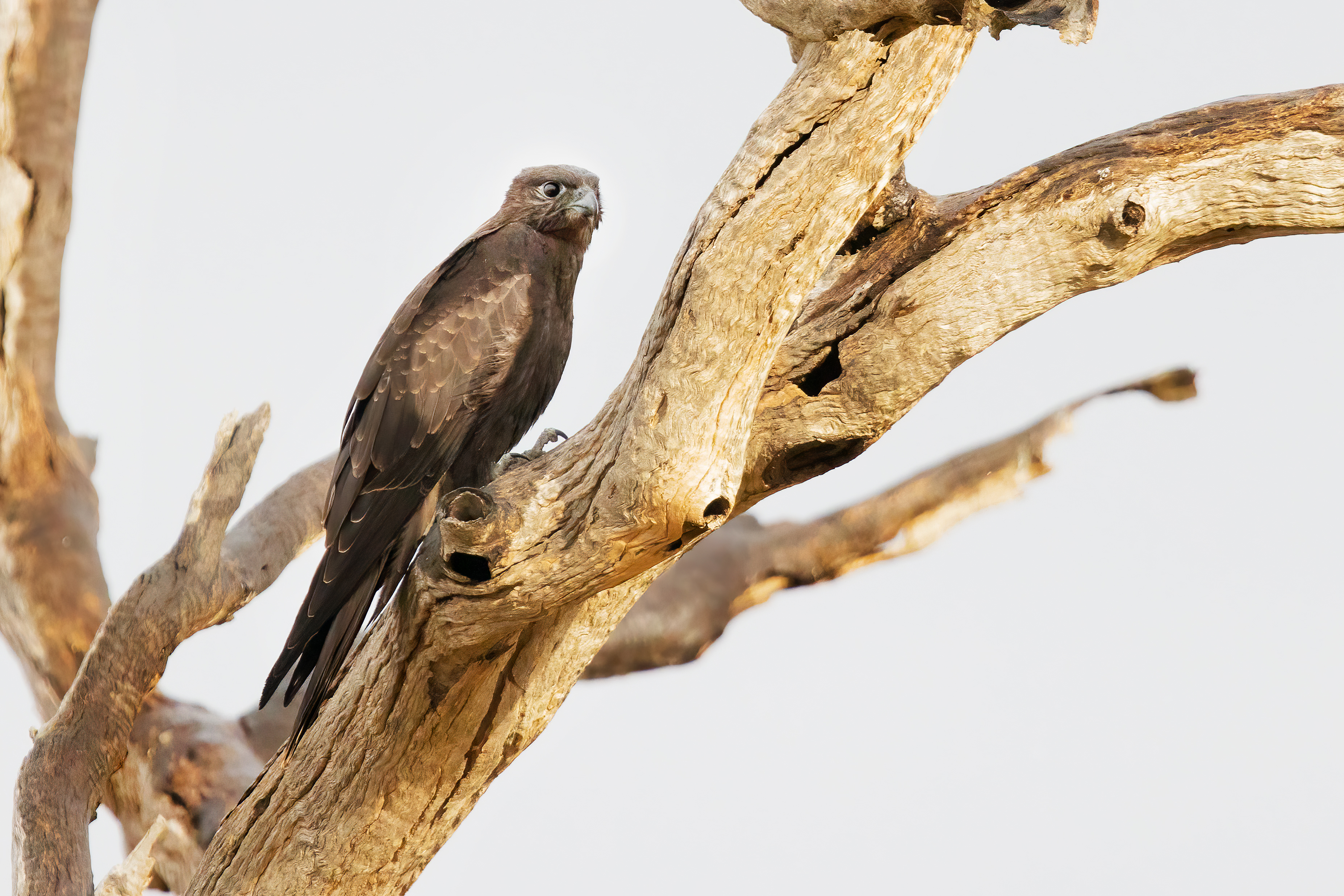

Conservation status
- Least Concern (IUCN 3.1)

Scientific classification
- Kingdom: Animalia
- Phylum: Chordata
- Class: Aves
- Order: Falconiformes
- Family: Falconidae
- Genus: Falco
- Species: F. subniger

Binomial name
- Falco subniger Gray, 1843

= Black falcon =

Falcon species

The black falcon (Falco subniger) is a medium-large falcon that is endemic to Australia. It can be found in all mainland states and territories and yet is regarded as Australia's most under-studied falcon.

== Description ==
The information in this section is based on recent descriptions by several authors (notably, Debus & Davies 2012, Debus & Olsen 2011, Morcombe 2002 and Birds in Backyards n.d.).

Size (adult, beak to tail): 45 – 56 cm (average 50 cm), tail makes up about half the length. Note: Females are larger than males - this is a form of sexual dimorphism.

Average weight: 833 g (female) 582 g (male).

Wing span: 95 –115 cm.

Colouration is uniform dark brown to sooty black; juveniles are generally darker than adults; underwing feathers are two-tone (flight feathers slightly paler); adults may have an evident dark stripe below the eye. Occasionally the birds may have a white chin, spots on underwing coverts or bars on undertail coverts. Cere, eye ring and feet are pale grey (or pale blue-grey); eye is dark brown and beak tip is black. Talons are black. Chick is white down.

The falcon's body is streamlined with a relatively long tail and slim build. Wings are long and pointed tapering toward wing tip.

=== Notes on identification ===
When attempting to identify a flying raptor Debus & Davies recommend concentrating on the bird's silhouette (including shape of wings and proportions), flight style and vocalisations, rather than on details of colouration.

Australian falcons can be differentiated from hawks by their toothed upper mandible (with a corresponding notch in their lower mandible) and by their long pointed wings.

Brown falcons (Falco berigora) are a common and widespread species in Australia, and they are the most likely to be confused with the black falcon (particularly brown falcon juveniles and black morphs). In fact, Debus & Olsen suggest many observations and behaviour of brown falcons have mistakenly been attributed to the black falcon, due to incorrect identification. The two species differ in the relative length of exposed tarsi (the lower, visible half of the bird's leg) compared with thigh feathers, flight style, wing attitude, and bold underwing barring and tail barring (which appear on the brown falcon only).

== Taxonomy ==
The black falcon belongs to the family Falconidae, as do the other three falcon species which are found in Australia, the brown falcon, grey falcon (Falco hypoleucos) and peregrine falcon (F. peregrinus).

Genetic analysis has revealed that the black falcon may be an early offshoot of the Old World hierofalcons - such as the saker falcon (F. cherrug) and laggar falcon (F. jugger).

== Population and threat status ==
The black falcon is listed as Critically Endangered in Victoria, Vulnerable in New South Wales, and Rare in South Australia. It is listed as a species of Least Concern under The IUCN Red List of Threatened Species 2024 and is generally considered scarce, uncommon and nomadic.

== Distribution and habitat ==
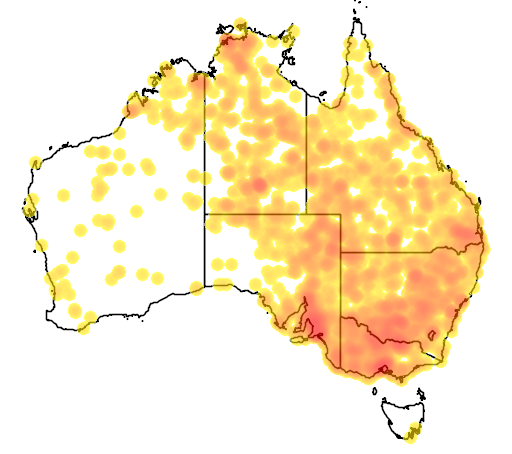
Distribution map showing records of the black falcon. Source: Atlas of Living Australia.

The black falcon is widely distributed across mainland Australia, except densely forested areas. The species is only occasionally seen in the southern interior of WA and is sparse in coastal areas of south eastern Australia. BirdLife International also lists occasional, non-breeding vagrants to New Zealand.

Total distribution area has been estimated at 5,910,000 km^{2}.

The black falcon's habitat is usually in the arid and semi arid zones. It is usually found near watercourses or utilizing patches of isolated trees. It hunts over open wooded grasslands, saltbush plains, bluebush plains and other low vegetation. In arid areas it will hunt over wetlands or near artificial or temporary water bodies – areas which tend to attract the most abundant birdlife.

== Behaviour and ecology ==
The black falcon is known to both harass and be harassed by other bird species, including raptors and corvids. It may be found resting on power poles during the day but will not sit on wires.

=== Flight and hunting style ===
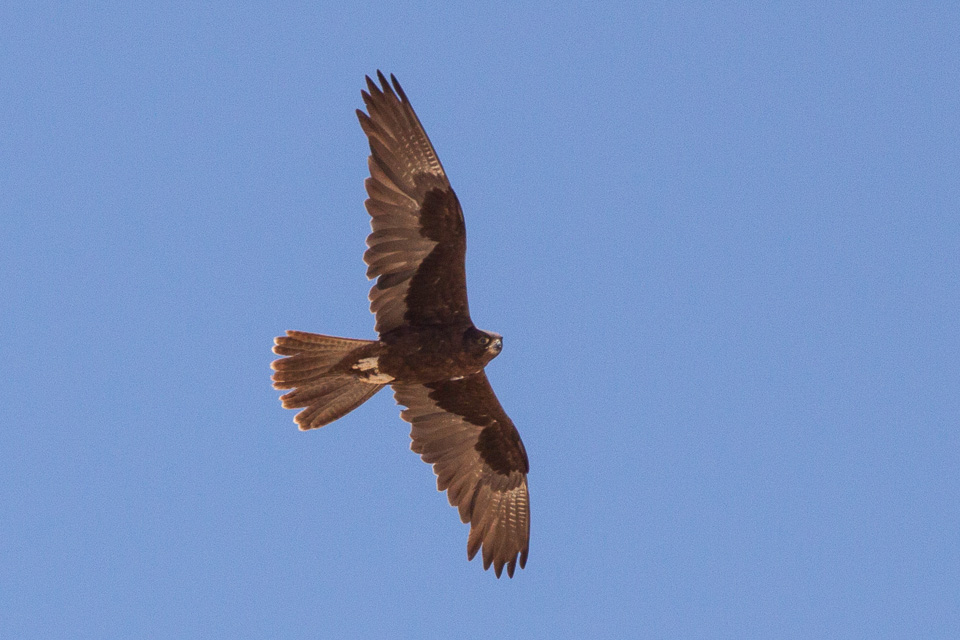
Black falcon in flight

The falcon's flight has been described as variable. Generally it flies with relaxed 'crow-like' wingbeats with occasional soaring. It also flies with a stiffer, shorter wingbeat. It glides and soars with slightly drooped or sometimes horizontal wings, carpals forward (wings are stretched out straight when gliding). Tail is normally folded (except when soaring, when it is fanned with notched corners). It often soars for long periods without flapping and catches prey in the air or on the ground. In pursuit of prey it uses powerful, rapid wingbeats. While resting the bird's wing tips are shorter than the tail and legs appear short.

The species usually hunts alone but has also been observed hunting cooperatively in pairs and occasionally in larger numbers, when prey is abundant (specifically, when stubble fires yield an abundant prey source. Twelve birds were seen at one such fire near Gundagai, NSW.

They have often been observed using contour hunting (over treetops), surprising and taking birds on the wing. They will sometimes tail chase other birds over long distances, and less often engage in a Peregrine-like vertical stoop when hunting. The species preys upon and is sometimes the prey of other raptors.

=== Diet ===
The black falcon's diet primarily consists of bird species, from finch to cockatoo size but they have also been observed feeding on small mammals (i.e. rabbits, mice and rats), insects and carrion. Avian prey species include:

- various pigeons (including crested pigeon Ocyphaps lophotes and the feral rock dove Columba livia)
- Australian pipit (Anthus australis)
- Australian magpie (Gymnorhina tibicen)
- Australian ringneck (Barnardius zonarius)
- Black-faced Cuckooshrike (Coracina novaehollandiae)
- Blue bonnet (Northiella haematogaster)
- Budgerigar (Melopsittacus undulatus)
- Common starling (Sturnus vulgaris)
- Eastern rosella (Platycercus eximius)
- Fairy martin (Petrochelidon ariel)
- Galah (Eolophus roseicapillus)
- Grey Teal (Anas gracilis)
- Honeyeaters (Meliphagidae)
- Horsfield's bush lark (Mirafra javanica)
- Little buttonquail (Turnix velox)
- Little corella (Cacatua sanguinea)
- Musk lorikeet (Glossopsitta concinna)
- Stubble quail (Coturnix pectoralis)
- Zebra finch (Taeniopygia guttata)

Debus & Zuccon also observed the black falcon hunting turquoise parrot (Neophema pulchella) and apostlebird (Struthidea cinerea), but on these occasions the attacks were unsuccessful.

=== Breeding ===
Laying time: between May and November (usually July to September). Clutch size: 1 - 5 (usually 3 or 4). Egg size: 42x32 mm. Incubation: approximately 34 days (by female, possibly by male for short periods). Nestling period: 5.5 – 7 weeks. Life span: at least 12 years in the wild, and 20 years in captivity.

The black falcon nests in living or dead trees, using the stick nests of corvids or other raptors. It may take over nests occupied by other birds. It appears there may be interspecific competition for nest sites between the black falcon and other raptors and corvids. Nest sites may be a limiting factor for black falcons, specifically where there has large-scale vegetation clearing, such as occurred in the sheep-wheat belt of NSW.

During breeding season males perform courtship displays such as horizontal figure eights around the nest. The male bring food to the female during incubation and brooding. During the later nestling period both sexes may forage to feed the young.

Post-fledging behaviour and development of young falcons appears to be very similar to that of the peregrine falcon, and includes spending time with siblings and parents, and practicing hunting, territorial and courtship behaviours.

=== Vocalisations ===
The most common call is similar to the 'cackle' of the peregrine falcon but is slower and deeper – gaak-gaar-gaak. The guttural call is shorter and more rapid when being attacked or when intruders are nearby – gak-gak-gak-gak. Some authors suggest the bird screams when attacking prey but this attribution could be a result of misidentifications of brown falcons, with other authors contesting that the birds are generally silent during attack. The male also makes a sharp, rather high-pitched eeik..eeik..eeik or ee-chip…ee-chip during courtship displays, and the female has a whine or wail when begging for food or copulating.

=== Home range, dispersal ===
The species' home range is undetermined, but likely to be greater than 100 km^{2}. The species appears to be wide-ranging in the non-breeding season, but is also known to stay in regular non-breeding territories for lengthy periods.

== Threats and management ==
Declining numbers of black falcons is a growing concern, with two states (Victoria and New South Wales) already having listed the species as vulnerable. Several authors have pointed out that population and other ecological data on the species is deficient, and addressing this issue should be a major priority for managers in the future.

The primary threats to the species are all anthropogenic. These include clearing of habitat, degradation of habitat by over grazing, collision with vehicles and shooting. Clearing of big, old trees and breeding sites in riparian areas is of particular concern.

The species also faces competition from corvids and other raptors over nest sites and possibly prey. Disturbance of nest sites and harassment by other birds (including cockatoos) also appears to impact the falcon's breeding success.

Recommendations for ongoing management include monitoring of populations and further research into its biology and ecology. The Office of Environment and Heritage (NSW Government) has identified eight priority actions that aim to help recover the species. These include: protecting and monitoring known nest sites; protecting old stick nests that could make suitable breeding sites for the species; protecting and recruiting large old trees; engaging landholders in the management of habitat; expanding habitat (particularly along riparian areas); research into dietary requirements and awareness raising. Victoria does not appear to have a recovery plan in place for the black falcon.
