= Altai falcon =

Scientific classification
- Kingdom: Animalia
- Phylum: Chordata
- Class: Aves
- Order: Falconiformes
- Family: Falconidae
- Genus: Falco
- Species: F. cherrug
- Subspecies: F. c. altaicus

Trinomial name
- Falco cherrug altaicus (Menzbier MA, 1891)

Synonyms
- Hierofalco altaicus Menzbier, 1891; Falco altaicus (Menzbier, 1891); Falco lorenzi Sushkin, 1938

Color morph of the Central Asian saker falcon

The Altai falcon is as a color morph of the Central Asian saker falcon (Falco cherrug milvipes), as per the latest genetic research (Zinevich et al. 2023). Previously, it was variously classified as a morph, a subspecies (Falco cherrug altaicus), and even separate species (Falco altaicus). It used to have a high reputation among Central Asian falconers.

== Distribution and taxonomy ==
The Altai falcon breeds in a relatively small area of Central Asia across the Altai and Sayan Mountains. This area overlaps with the much larger breeding area of the saker falcon (Falco cherrug). Previously, it was believed that Altai falcons were either natural hybrids between sakers and gyrfalcons (Falco rusticolus), or rather the descendants of such rare hybrids backcrossing into the large population of sakers. However, the most recent research has demonstrated that Altai falcons are genetically intermingled with the broader Asian Saker population and do not constitute a distinct cluster, indicating that they do not represent a separate taxonomic entity.

== Literature ==
- Almásy Gy 1903. Vándor-utam Ázsia szívébe. (My Travels to the Heart of Asia – in Hungarian) Budapest, Természettudományi Könyvkiadó-vállalat.
- Eastham CP, Nicholls MK, Fox NC 2002. Morphological variation of the saker (Falco cherrug) and the implications for conservation. Biodiversity and Conservation, 11, 305–325.
- Ellis DH 1995. What is Falco altaicus Menzbier? Journal of Raptor Research, 29, 15–25.
- Zinevich, L, Prommer, M, Laczkó, L, Rozhkova, D, Sorokin, A, Karyakin, I, Bagyura, J, Cserkész, T, Sramkó 2023. Phylogenomic insights into the polyphyletic nature of Altai falcons within eastern sakers (Falco cherrug) and the origins of gyrfalcons (Falco rusticolus) Scientific Reports, 13:17800.
- Menzbier MA 1891. (1888–1893). Ornithologie du Turkestan et des pays adjacents (Partie No. -O. de la Mongolie, steppes Kirghiz, contree Aralo-Caspienne, partie superieure du bassin d'Oxus, Pamir). Vol. 12. Publiee par l'Auteur, Moscow, Russia.
- Nittinger F, Gamauf A, Pinsker W, Wink M, Haring E 2007. Phylogeography and population structure of the saker falcon (Falco cherrug) and the influence of hybridization: mitochondrial and microsatellite data. Molecular Ecology, 16, 1497–1517.
- Orta J 1994. 57. Saker Falcon. In: del Hoyo J, Elliott A, Sargatal J (eds.): Handbook of Birds of the World, Volume 2: New World Vultures to Guineafowl: 273–274, plate 28. Lynx Edicions, Barcelona. ISBN 84-87334-15-6
- Pfander 2011. Semispecies and Unidentified Hidden Hybrids (for Example of Birds of Prey) Raptors Conservation 23: 74–105.
- Potapov E, Sale R 2005. The Gyrfalcon. Poyser Species Monographs. A & C Black Publishers, London.
- Sushkin PP 1938. Birds of the Soviet Altai and adjacent parts of north-western Mongolia. Vol. 1. [In Russian.] Academy of Science of USSR Press, Moscow, Russia.

== External links to rare photos ==
- Altai falcon, Western Mongolia
- Altai falcon, Western Mongolia
- Altai falcon, Kazakhstan
