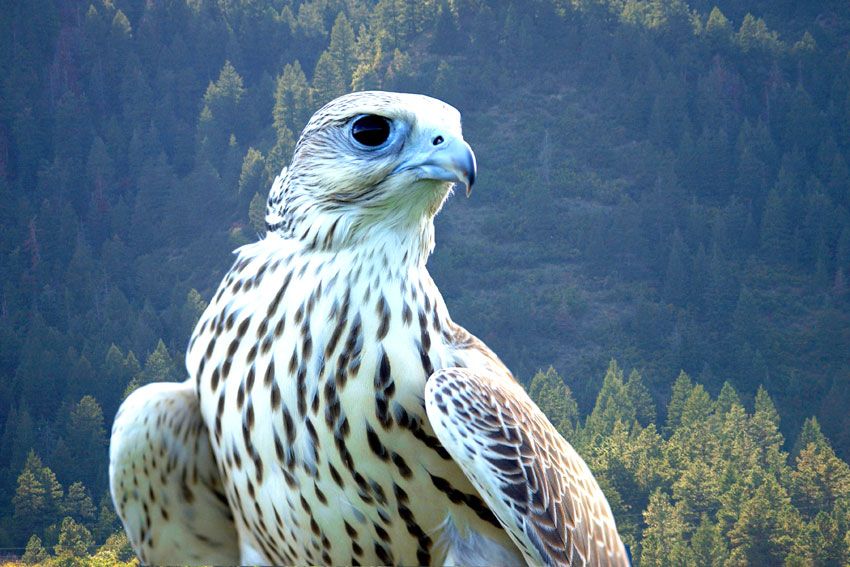
- Yeti, a hybrid white gyrfalcon × saker falcon. Hierofalcons hybridize readily, and offspring are often fully fertile.

Scientific classification
- Kingdom: Animalia
- Phylum: Chordata
- Class: Aves
- Order: Falconiformes
- Family: Falconidae
- Genus: Falco
- Subgenus: Hierofalco; Cuvier, 1817

Species
- Falco biarmicus Falco cherrug Falco jugger Falco rusticolus

Synonyms
- Jerafalco Kaup, 1850 (unjustified emendation); Falco hierofalco (see text)

= Hierofalcon =

Hierofalcons

Subgenus of birds

The hierofalcons are four closely related species of falcon which make up the subgenus Hierofalco:

- Lanner falcon, Falco biarmicus
- Laggar falcon, Falco jugger
- Saker falcon, Falco cherrug
- Gyrfalcon, Falco rusticolus

The black falcon of Australia is occasionally considered allied to the hierofalcons: indeed it seems fairly close to them (Wink et al. 2004).

They represent members of their genus which are similar to species like the peregrine falcon in outward appearance, but usually with more phaeomelanins which impart reddish or brown colors, and generally more strongly patterned plumage reminiscent of hawks. Their undersides usually have a lengthwise pattern of dark blotches, lines or arrowhead marks. They hunt usually in level flight, more like Accipiters than peregrines with their dive attack or hobbies with their acrobatic pursuits.

Recent DNA sequence data studies have confirmed that the hierofalcons are a monophyletic group—and, incidentally, that hybridization runs rampant in the present species complex. Initial results of mtDNA cytochrome b sequence analyses that suggested they are basal among all living falcons were in error, due to a numt (Wink & Sauer-Gürth 2000). The biogeographically entirely distinct prairie falcon was sometimes placed with the hierofalcons due to its similar coloration; it is now considered not to belong in this subgenus, the similarities being the result of convergent evolution in adaptation to similar habitat.

The hierofalcon lineage as such seems of Late Pliocene origin, maybe as old as the "typical" kestrels (Gelasian, some 2.5–2 million years ago), maybe somewhat older, though little is known about their fossil history. It seems to have originated in Africa or adjacent regions but apparently became nearly extinct in the past: the present hierofalcon diversity is of rather recent origin, presumably not older than the Eemian interglacial (about 130,000–115,000 years ago) at the start of the Late Pleistocene; only one of the hierofalcon species that presumably diverged between the Pliocene and the Middle Pleistocene has left any living descendants. The lanner falcon appears to be the most phylogenetically ancient species (mainly judging from biogeography); the others diverged—apparently out of a population isolated in northeastern Africa some time during the Riss glaciation 200,000 to 130,000 years ago—in a brief and rapid bout of evolution. DNA sequence data analyses in this group suffers from the extensive hybridization and incomplete lineage sorting confounding the data, and studies with small sample sizes can by no means be considered reliable. Sometimes, all hierofalcons are lumped into one species, Falco hierofalco.

Possible examples of such extinct hierofalcon lineages include Falco bakalovi occurring from the Early Pliocene of Bulgaria to Early Pleistocene of Spain and the Czech Republic and Falco antiquus known from the Middle Pleistocene of Noailles (France) and possibly Hór-völgy (Hungary).

Their name may mean "sacred falcon" (Greek ἱερος = "sacred"), or it may mean "hawk-falcon" and contain a Greek grammatical error (Greek ἱεραξ = "hawk", but the correct combining form of ἱεραξ is "hieraco-").
