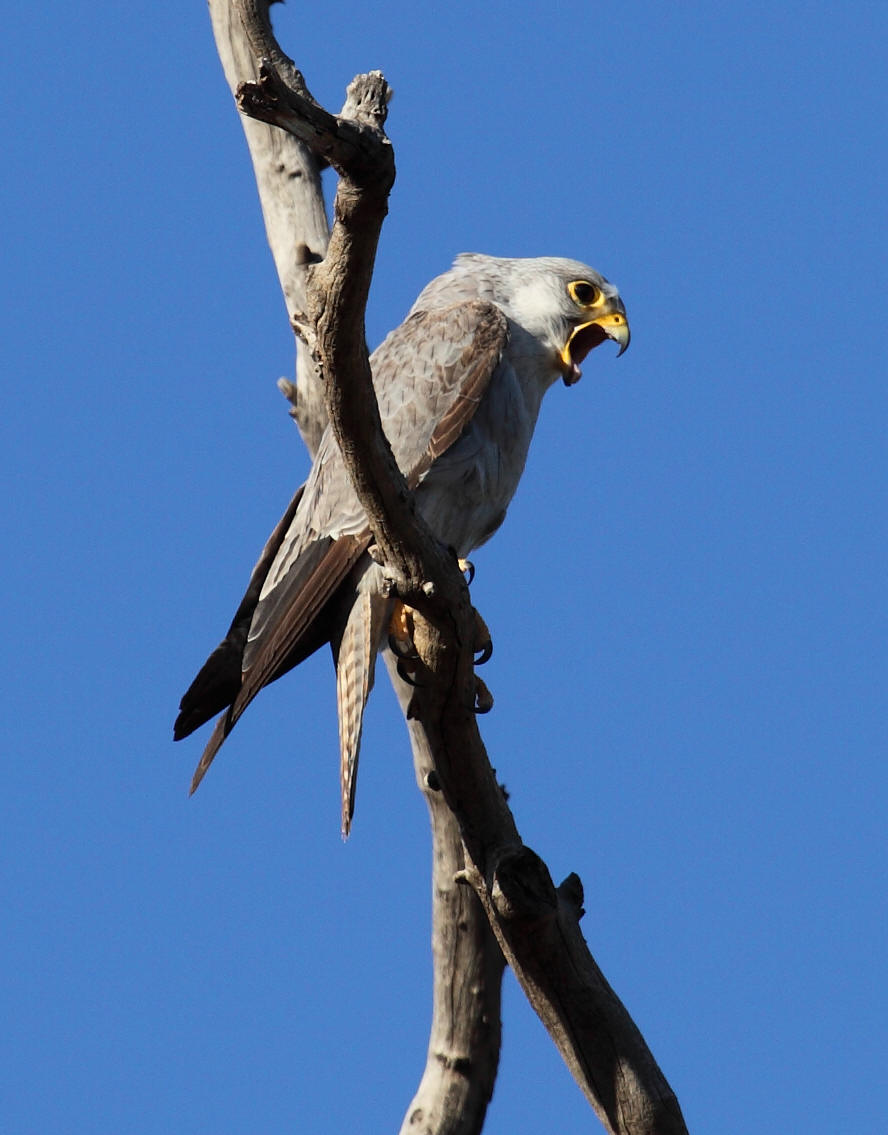

Conservation status
- Vulnerable (IUCN 3.1)

Scientific classification
- Kingdom: Animalia
- Phylum: Chordata
- Class: Aves
- Order: Falconiformes
- Family: Falconidae
- Genus: Falco
- Species: F. hypoleucos

Binomial name
- Falco hypoleucos Gould, 1841

= Grey falcon =

Species of bird

The grey falcon (Falco hypoleucos) is a medium-sized falcon native to Australia, possibly the rarest. It is uncommon throughout its range and is currently classified as Vulnerable.

== Taxonomy ==
The description of the species was published by John Gould, based on a specimen obtained from Lockier Burges, a pastoralist at York, Western Australia, who provided it to the collector John Gilbert. Gould's description was issued in the fifth volume (1841) of The Birds of Australia, and was accompanied by a lithograph produced by Elizabeth Gould, rendered shortly before her early death. The specimen obtained from Burges, mentioned in Gilbert's report of September 1839, was later revealed to be an immature bird when another specimen was shot by Gilbert in 1842. This bird, found 60 kilometres north of Moore River, was larger and paler than the first Gilbert had supplied, and although he thought it may be an older bird he hopefully noted it as a possible new species. The explorer Charles Sturt also collected two specimens, and these were forwarded to Gould in England. Gould wrote an emended description and commissioned Henry Constantine Richter to produce a new plate, this was issued in the 1848 volume of the same work.

The specific epithet hypoleucos is derived from Ancient Greek, literally 'beneath' and 'white' to mean 'whitish'.

== Description ==
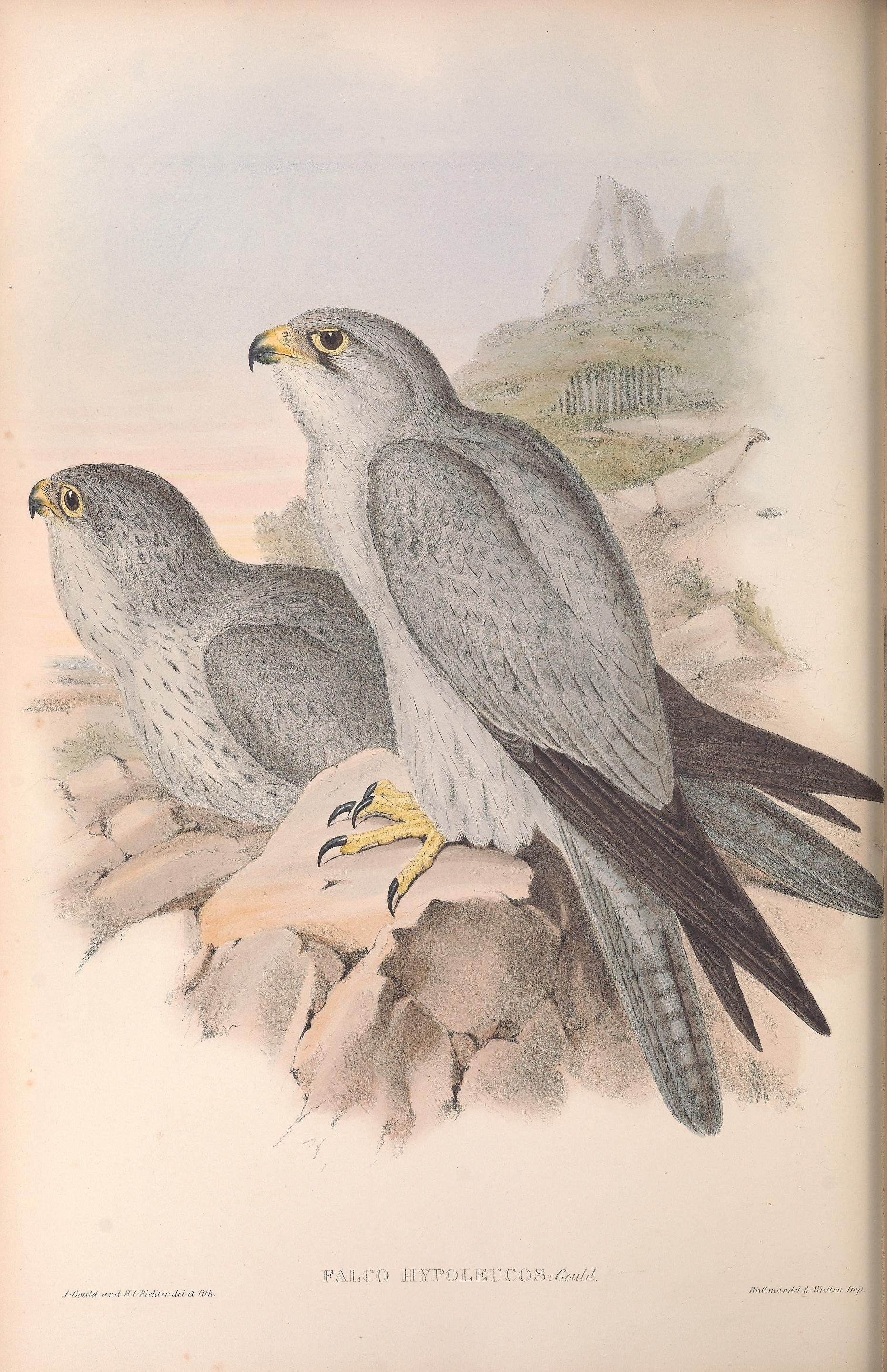
Richter lithograph of immature (left) and adult specimen, 1848

The species has mainly grey upperparts and white underparts, darker on the tips of the flight feathers and with a yellow cere. Young birds are darker. Adults have a body length of 30–45 cm and a wingspan of 85–95 cm, and weight 350–600 g. Females are larger. The call of the grey falcon consists of hoarse chattering, clucking and whining sounds, similar to the peregrine falcon but slower and deeper. Calls include a loud, slow "kek-kek-kek" or "kak-ak-ak-ak".

Both of the collectors of Gould's specimens were effusive in their praise of this falcon's appearance, Sturt's field note says it had a "delicate beauty", and when Gilbert obtained his second specimen in August 1842 he wrote,

I assure you I never gazed with more delight on any Specimen I ever Shot, than on this Bird, as it lay in the grass, throwing up its feet to prevent my hand reaching it.

— John Gilbert, Letter to Gould. October, 1842.

== Distribution and habitat ==
The grey falcon is an Australian endemic, usually confined to the arid inland. It inhabits Triodia grassland, Acacia shrubland, and lightly timbered arid woodland. It has been sighted over most of mainland Australia except for Cape York. Very few have been seen on the Nullarbor Plain and in the Great Victoria, Gibson and Great Sandy Deserts. Most sightings of the grey falcon have been within the arid zones, with annual rainfall less than 500 mm. When they have been occasionally seen outside of these areas, they have been found in similar dry, low altitude, open woodland or grassland. The only times this bird has been seen in different conditions has been along the Queensland coast during drought years. The grey falcon is often seen in family-type groups of an adult pair and usually one (but up to four) first year birds.

In Sturt's notes to his 1845 contribution to Gould's set of specimens, collected at the interior of New South Wales, he commented that the pair were the only individuals to be seen in their seventeen-month exploration of the region. The grey falcon is one of the world's rarest falcons, and possibly the rarest of the Australian falcons, and may also have been historically uncommon.

== Ecology ==
=== Diet ===
When sighted and observed, most grey falcons have been seen hunting. They have a habit of eating on the ground, in the open and around inland bores which make them quite easy to observe while eating. From 88% of observations it can be said that their main prey is other birds, followed by small mammals (6%), reptiles (5%) and invertebrates such as locusts and worms (1%). The birds which they feed on usually form flocks and feed on the ground which is typical of birds in arid regions such as parrots and pigeons. Grey falcons have also been sighted with animals such as; a mallee ringneck, a duck, a yellow-rumped thornbill, locusts, snakes, the house mouse, rabbit kittens, lamb carcasses and one has even been seen pursuing a bat.

=== Nesting ===
The grey falcon's breeding range has shrunk recently with breeding occurring in the more arid sections of their distribution. They breed once a year but may nest twice a year during abundant seasons or may not nest during drought times. Breeding and nesting occur within the distribution range with nests normally being an abandoned stick nest from another species of bird of prey. Nests are often selected in an upright fork, of the top of a tall tree. These can be located in a patch or a belt of timber along a watercourse in dry inland areas. Nests can be used for several years within the nesting season of July to October in the south and April to June in the North. The grey falcon eggs look very similar to the black falcon's (Falco subniger) but are slightly smaller. A clutch size is generally two or three and occasionally four eggs that are oval shaped and 51x38 mm on average.

== Conservation ==
The species has very low densities, numbering only 1,000 breeding pairs, but the population may be stable. Continued high levels of grazing in arid zone rangelands and clearance of the semi-arid zone for marginal farming is degrading habitat. The grey falcon occurs in several protected areas, including Sturt National Park.

Analysis of mitochondrial COI DNA sequence variation for grey falcons found low genetic diversity, indicating that the species can be managed as a single population. Despite the low genetic diversity, there was no evidence of a recent genetic bottleneck in the species.

== Conservation listing ==
=== International ===
The species was previously listed as near-threatened; in 2012 it was uplisted to Vulnerable. Listed on CITES Appendix II.

=== Australian ===
Grey falcon are listed as endangered on the Australian Environment Protection and Biodiversity Conservation Act 1999.

=== State of Victoria, Australia ===
- The grey falcon is listed as threatened on the Victorian Flora and Fauna Guarantee Act (1988). Under this Act, an Action Statement for the recovery and future management of this species has been prepared.
- On the 2007 advisory list of threatened vertebrate fauna in Victoria, The grey falcon is listed as endangered.

=== State of Queensland, Australia ===
- The grey falcon is listed as rare under the Nature Conservation Act 1992.

=== State of Western Australia, Australia ===
- The grey falcon is listed as fauna that is rare or likely to become extinct under the Wildlife Conservation Act 1950.

=== State of New South Wales, Australia ===
- The grey falcon is listed as endangered under the NSW Biodiversity Conservation Act 2016.
