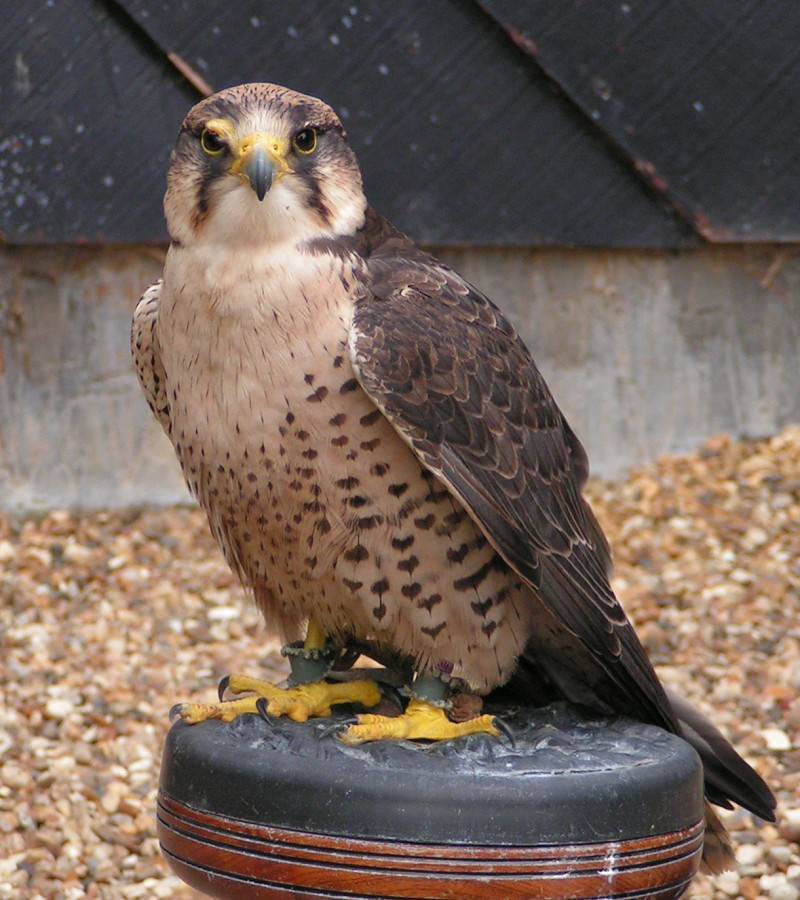
- Adult Falco biarmicus feldeggi

Conservation status
- Least Concern (IUCN 3.1)

Scientific classification
- Kingdom: Animalia
- Phylum: Chordata
- Class: Aves
- Order: Falconiformes
- Family: Falconidae
- Genus: Falco
- Subgenus: Hierofalco
- Species: F. biarmicus

Binomial name
- Falco biarmicus Temminck, 1825
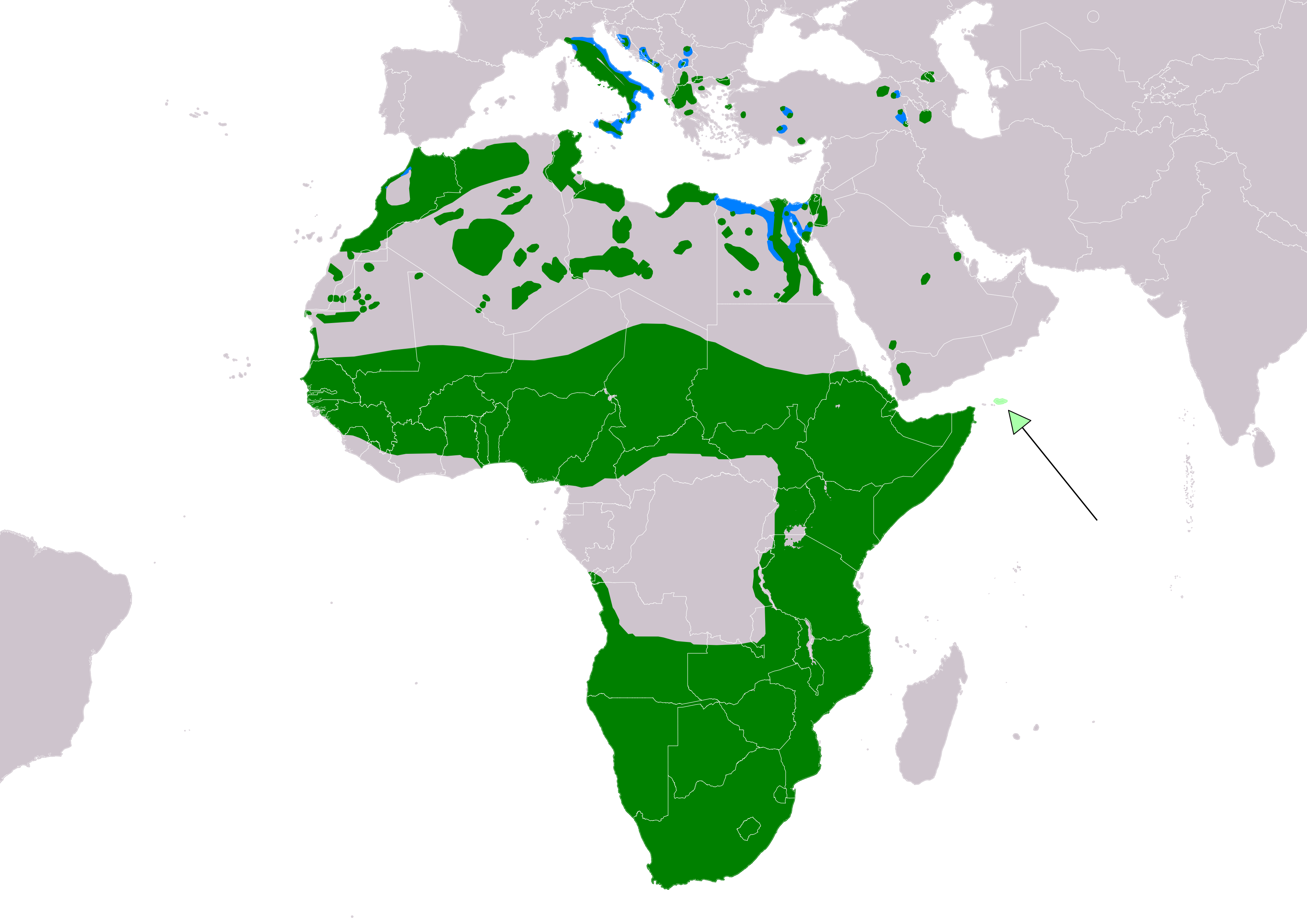
- Range of Falco biarmicus Resident Non-breeding Possibly Extant (resident)

Synonyms
- Falco feldeggii Schlegel, 1841; Falco lanarius Linnaeus, 1758

= Lanner falcon =

Bird of prey

The lanner falcon (Falco biarmicus) is a medium-sized bird of prey that breeds in Africa, southeast Europe and just into Asia. It prefers open habitat and is mainly resident, but some birds disperse more widely after the breeding season. A large falcon, it preys on birds and bats. Most likely either the lanner or peregrine falcon was the sacred species of falcon to the ancient Egyptians, and some ancient Egyptian deities, like Ra and Horus, were often represented as a man with the head of a lanner falcon.

== Taxonomy and etymology ==
The lanner falcon was described by the Dutch zoologist Coenraad Jacob Temminck in 1825 under the current binomial name Falco biarmicus. The type locality is Caffraria and the Cape of Good Hope. Falco is Late Latin for a "falcon", from falx, falcis "sickle". The Swedish naturalist Carl Linnaeus had used the specific epithet biarmicus for the bearded reedling and Temminck clearly believed that the word meant "bearded" but it is likely that Linnaeus was using the Latinized form for Bjarmaland, a district in northern Russia. The English word "lanner" is believed to come from the Old French lanier meaning "cowardly". The first recorded use of the word in English is from around 1400.

This is presumably the oldest living hierofalcon species. Support for this assumption comes mainly from biogeography agreeing better with the confusing pattern of DNA sequence data in this case than in others. Nonetheless, there is rampant hybridization (like the perilanner) and incomplete lineage sorting which confounds the data to a massive extent; molecular studies with small sample sizes cannot yield reliable conclusions in the entire hierofalcon group.

In any case, the radiation of the entire living diversity of hierofalcons seems to have taken place in the Eemian interglacial at the start of the Late Pleistocene, a mere 130,000–115,000 years ago; the lanner falcons would thus represent the lineage that became isolated in sub-Saharan Africa at some time during the Riss glaciation (200,000 to 130,000 years ago) already.

There are five recognised subspecies:

- F. b. biarmicus Temminck, 1825 – The nominate subspecies, ranges from the Democratic Republic of the Congo to southern Kenya south to South Africa
- F. b. feldeggii Schlegel, 1843 – Italy to Turkey, Azerbaijan and northwestern Iran
- F. b. tanypterus Schlegel, 1843 – northeastern Africa to Arabia, Israel and Iraq
- F. b. erlangeri Kleinschmidt, O., 1901 – northwestern Africa
- F. b. abyssinicus Neumann, 1904 – southern Mauritania to Ethiopia and Somalia south to Cameroon and northern Kenya

== Description ==
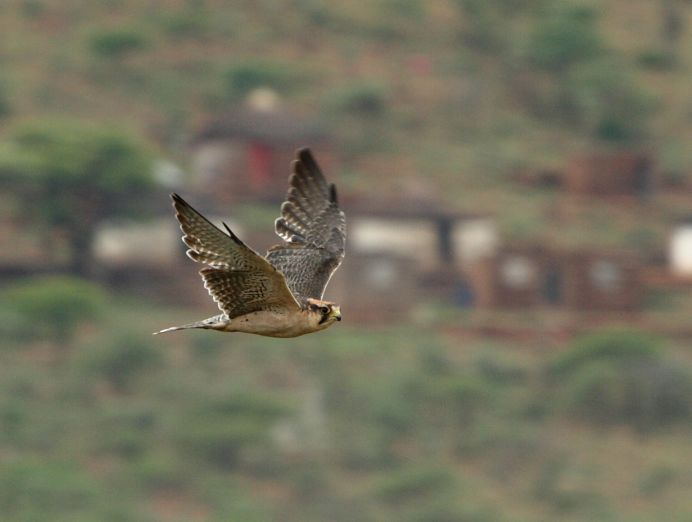
South Africa

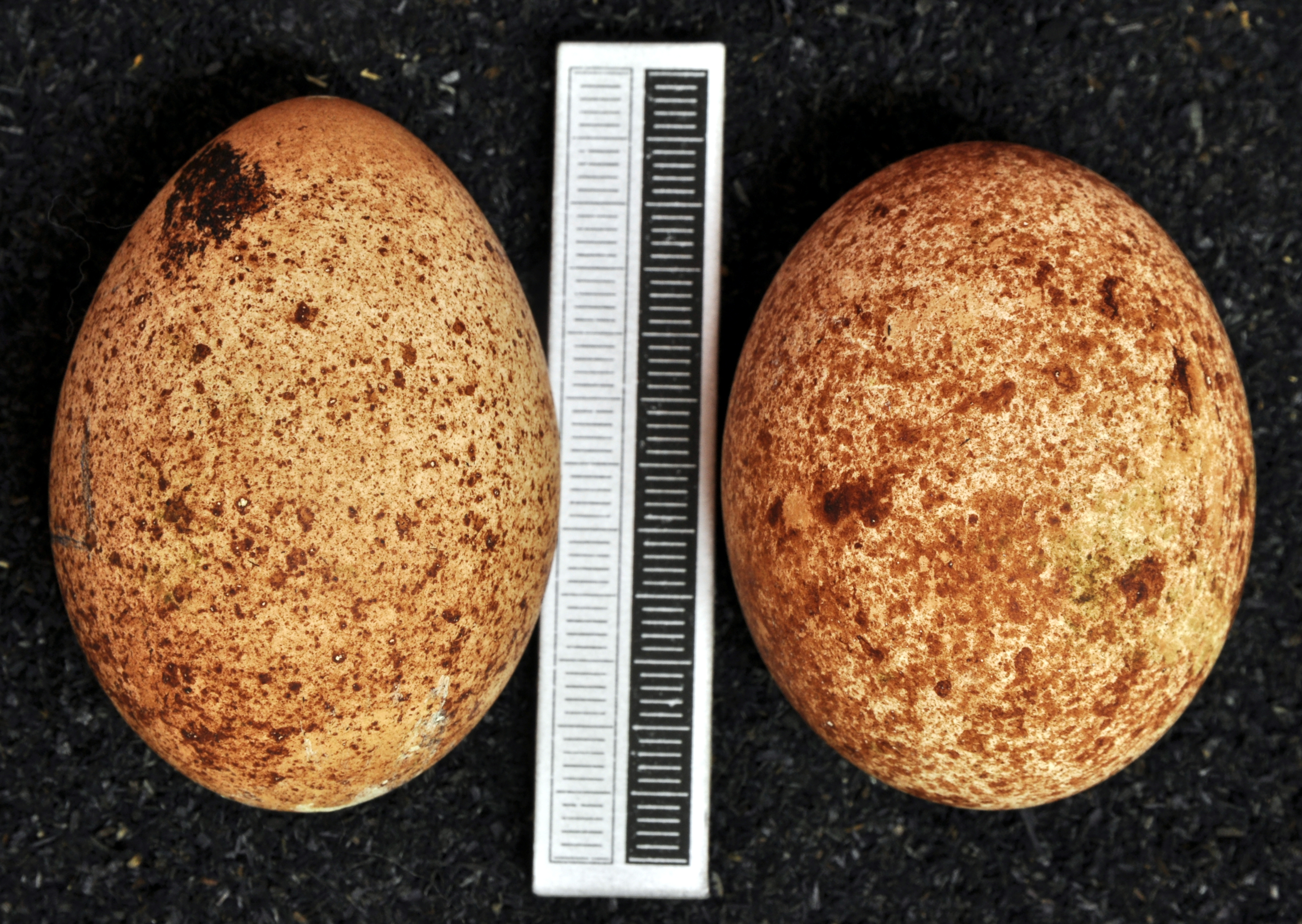
Eggs, Collection Museum Wiesbaden

It is a large falcon, at 43–50 cm (17–20 in) length with a wingspan of 95–105 cm (37–41 in). Eurasian lanner falcons (Falco biarmicus feldeggi, also called Feldegg's falcon) have slate grey or brown-grey upperparts; most African subspecies are a paler blue grey above. The breast is streaked in northern birds, resembling greyish saker falcons, but the lanner has a reddish back to the head. Sexes are similar, but the browner young birds resemble saker falcons even more. However, sakers have a lighter top of the head and less clear head-side patterns. The lanner's call is a harsh "wray-e".

== Distribution and habitat ==
Lanner falcons are predominantly located in open habitats and can range from the forest edge to the desert. However, they are most commonly found in open savannah and sour grasslands. In South Africa, they commonly inhabit the east of the country in grasslands and move into the Fynbos, Nama Karoo and Southern Kalahari during the non-breeding season.

Despite this movement, they are not truly migratory birds, and are usually limited to local movements. These movements may be in response to seasonal rains and altitudes, where higher elevations are inhabited during breeding season, and lower elevations are inhabited out of breeding season.

They are bred in captivity for falconry; hybrids with the peregrine ("perilanners") are also often seen. Merret (1666) claimed that the "lanar" lived in Sherwood Forest and the Forest of Dean in England; such populations would seem to have derived from escaped hunting birds of the nobility. Edward I of England (reigned 1272-1307), who had a passion for falconry, owned at least one lanner.

In the wild, lanner falcon numbers are strongly and steadily declining in Europe as well as in the whole North Africa, though the species remains relatively common in parts of Africa. In the Degua Tembien mountains of Ethiopia, it was observed to contribute to controlling pest rodents.

== Ecology ==
=== Moulting ===
Females usually moult from September to January, after the nesting period is over. Whereas, males moult from November to May, once the chicks can hunt for themselves.

=== Diet ===
Lanner falcons most commonly prey on other birds, including doves, pigeons and domestic chickens or fowls. These falcons have also been seen to prey on small mammals, reptiles and invertebrates. In Africa and Israel, lanner falcons were observed as hunting bats.

=== Hunting ===
It usually hunts by horizontal pursuit, rather than the peregrine falcon's stoop from a height, and takes mainly bird prey in flight. However, these raptors make use of a multitude of hunting styles, including stooping after soaring, attacking from a perch, attacking from a fast, low coursing flight and aerial attacks from a perch. Lanner falcons also exhibit co-operative hunting with high success rate specifically when hunting jackdaws, where the use of visual contact is used to coordinate the chase. Males most commonly make the initial attack, yet the prey is usually caught by the female.

== Behaviour ==
Before the breeding season, both males and females show mutual soaring and flapping flight which are closely synchronized from April to June. Near nesting sites, pairs have also been seen to power-dive together.

Once eggs are fledged, the female predominantly stays with and feeds the juveniles. However, the male takes over this role when the female needs to hunt. When the juveniles are about 25 days old, the female is commonly seen perched near the nest, but still spends a large amount of time in the nest with the juveniles. When the juveniles are about 39 days old, the female does not spend large amounts of time in the nest anymore and both the female and male are actively hunting.

=== Nesting habits ===
Lanner falcons usually nest on sheer cliff faces, and lay three or four eggs. They do not have strict nesting regulations and as a result are more common and do not show a patchy distribution. As a result they also make use of old crow nests and are sometimes seen nesting on pylons, trees and less steep cliff faces.

=== Breeding ===
Lanner falcon have a laying period in July which suggests a strategy to fledge young before the heat and heavy rain of the summer as well as before the influx of migratory birds during December to February. This timing may improve foraging conditions for juveniles which can increase the success of breeding. Breeding success for these falcons is largely affected by environmental conditions. The incubation period is thought to be 32 days and the nesting period to be 44 days. However, juveniles have been present near nests up to ten weeks after fledgling. The mean fledgling rate is 2.24 young per successful pair which is typical of large falcons, however, the mean number of individuals fledged overall per territorial pair is 1.3 which is low and may be due to the number of unproductive years towards the end of each territory's occupancy.

== Threats ==
Lanner falcons are of least concern on the IUCN Red List, yet they can still be negatively affected through anthropogenic process, directly and indirectly.

Direct anthropogenic threats to these raptors include nest robbery, vehicle collisions, electrocution from power lines and persecution. As chicks can barely fly when leaving the nest they are vulnerable and easy to catch, they are threatened by being captured for falconries and through being caught and killed by angry farmers as a result of these birds sometimes preying on domestic chickens.

Indirect anthropogenic threats include loss of suitable habitats as a result of human expansion and the intensive use of pesticides for agriculture.

== Gallery ==
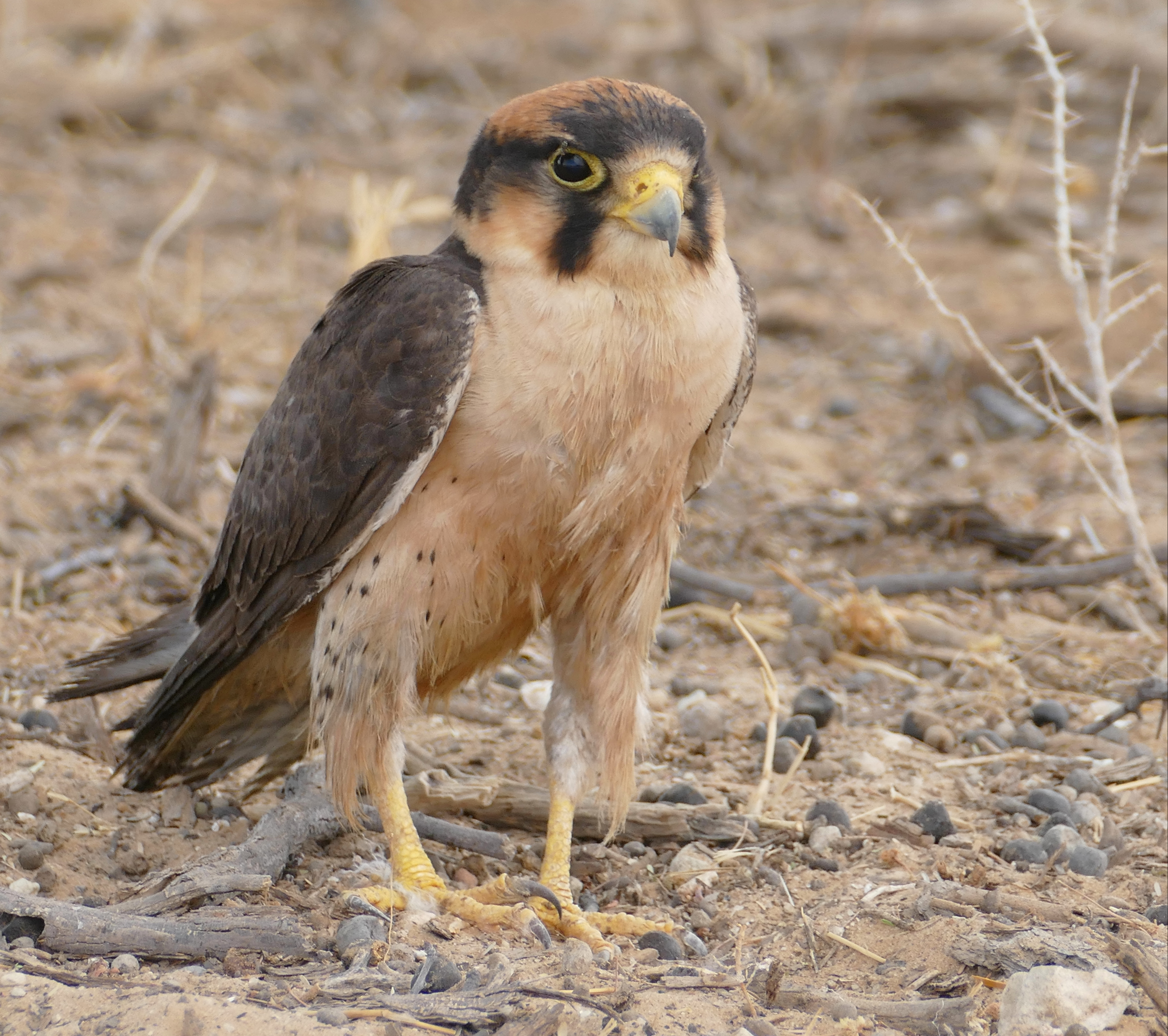
Lanner falcon at Kgalagadi Transfrontier Park, South Africa

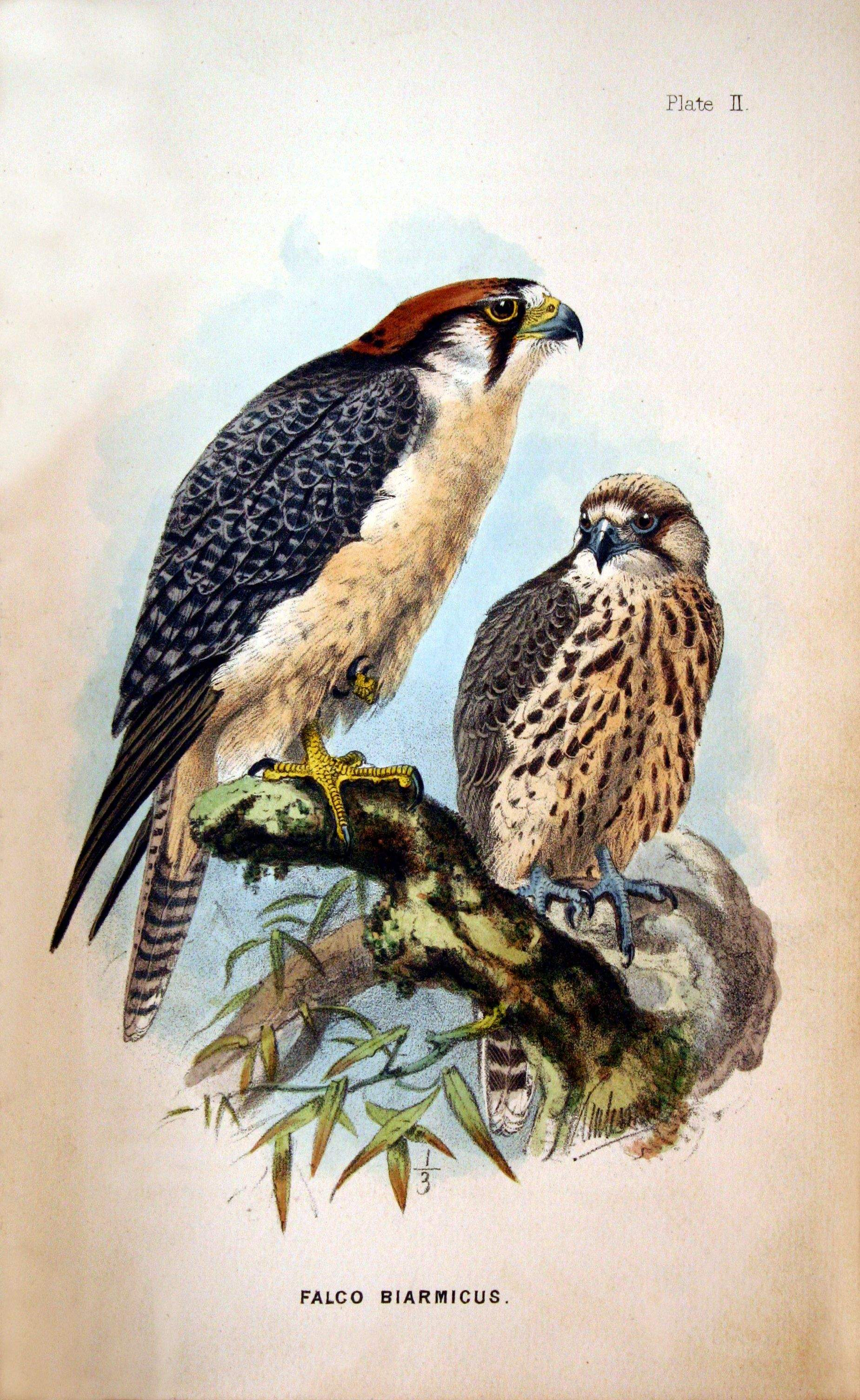
Painting by John Gerrard Keulemans (1884)

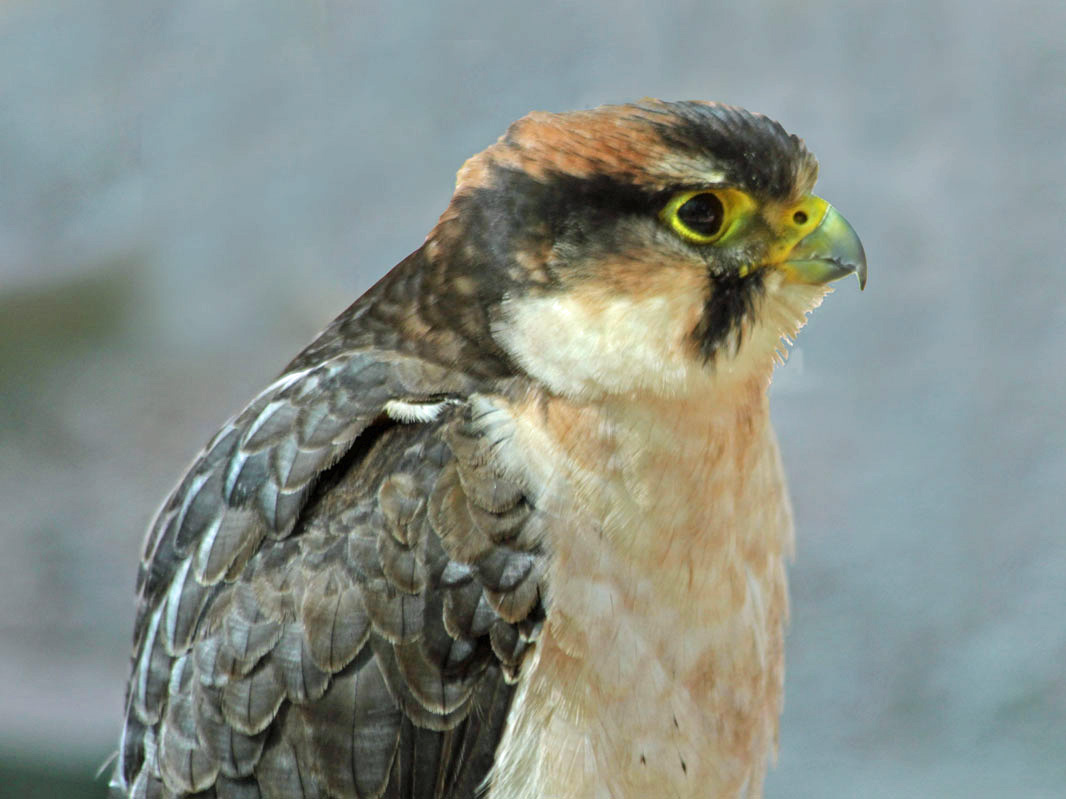
Lanner falcon at Plettenberg Bay, South Africa

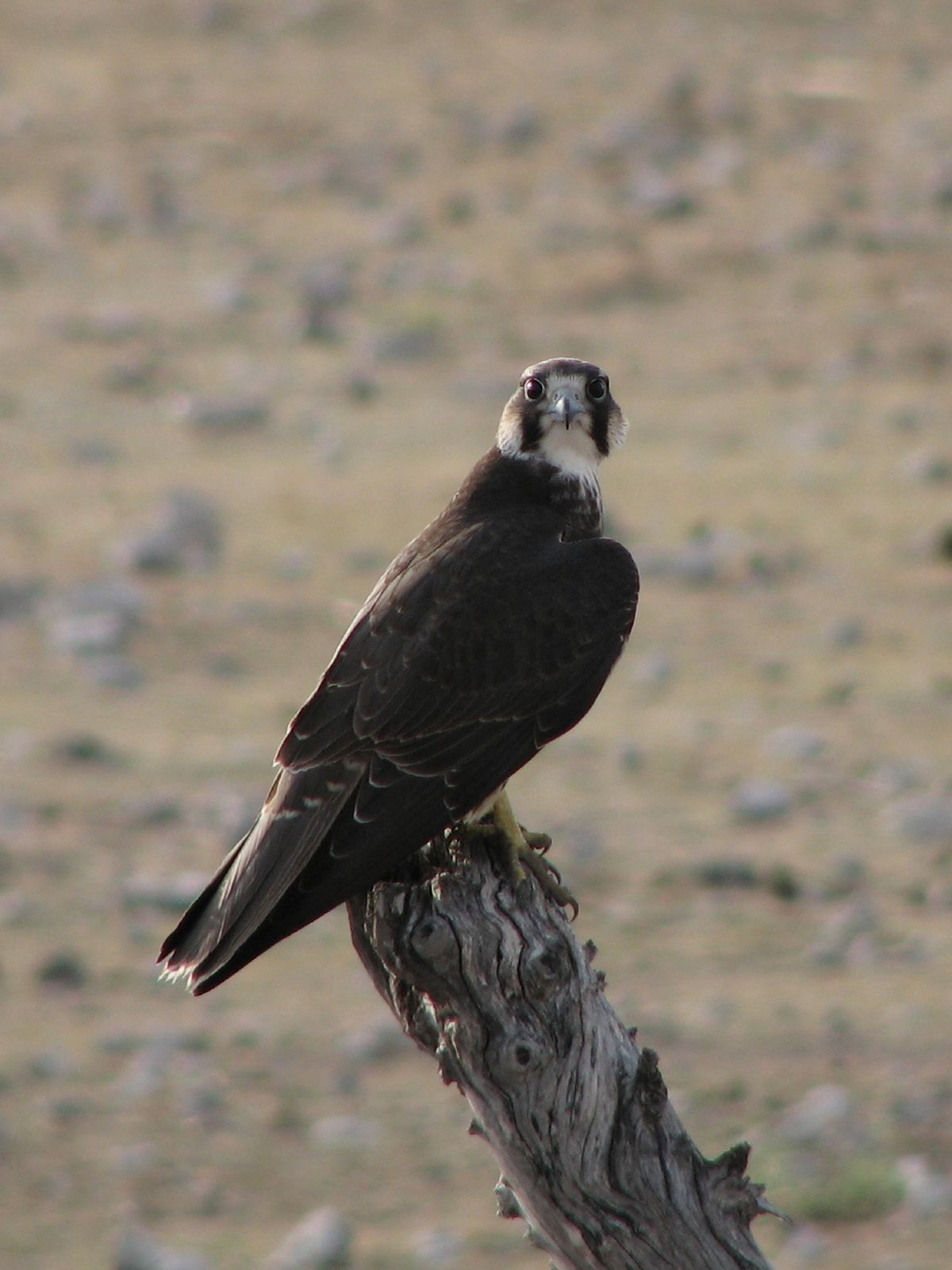
Adult Falco biarmicus biarmicus, Etosha National Park, Namibia.

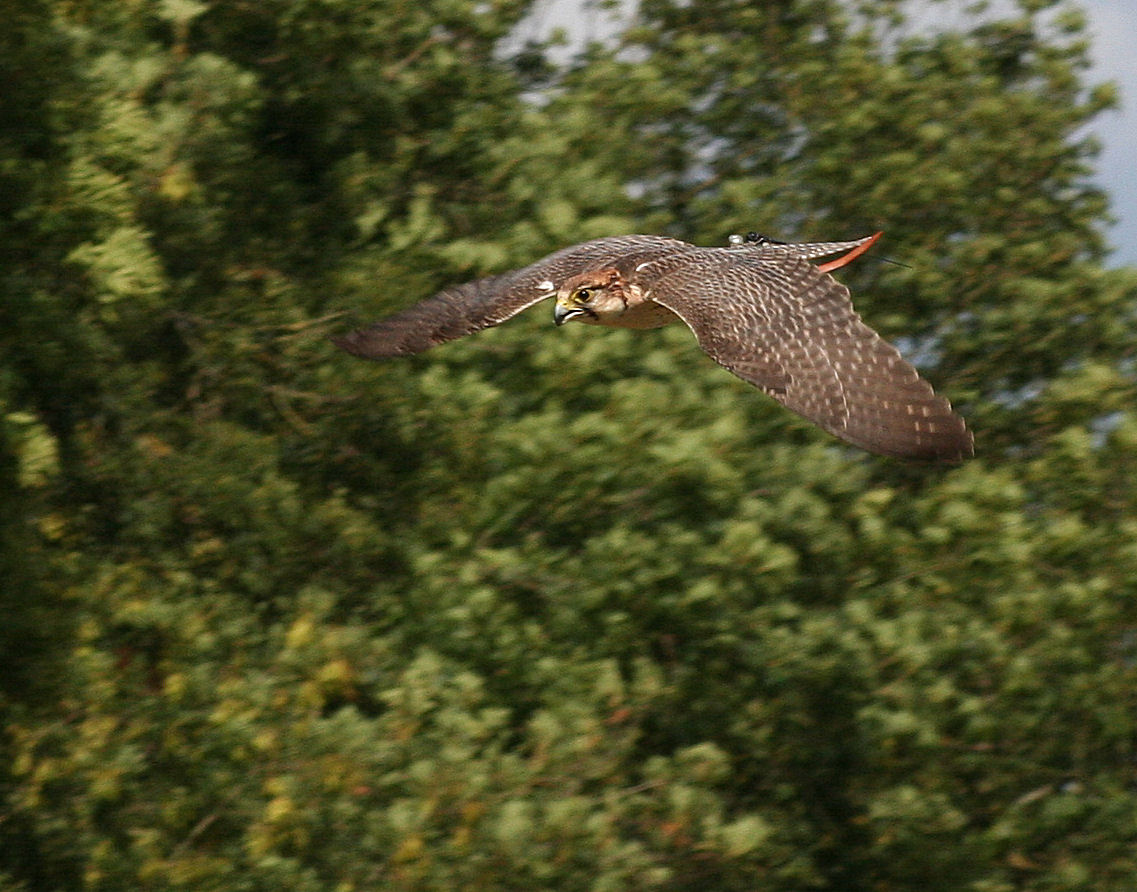
A falconer's lanner in a dive. Note distinct head coloration.

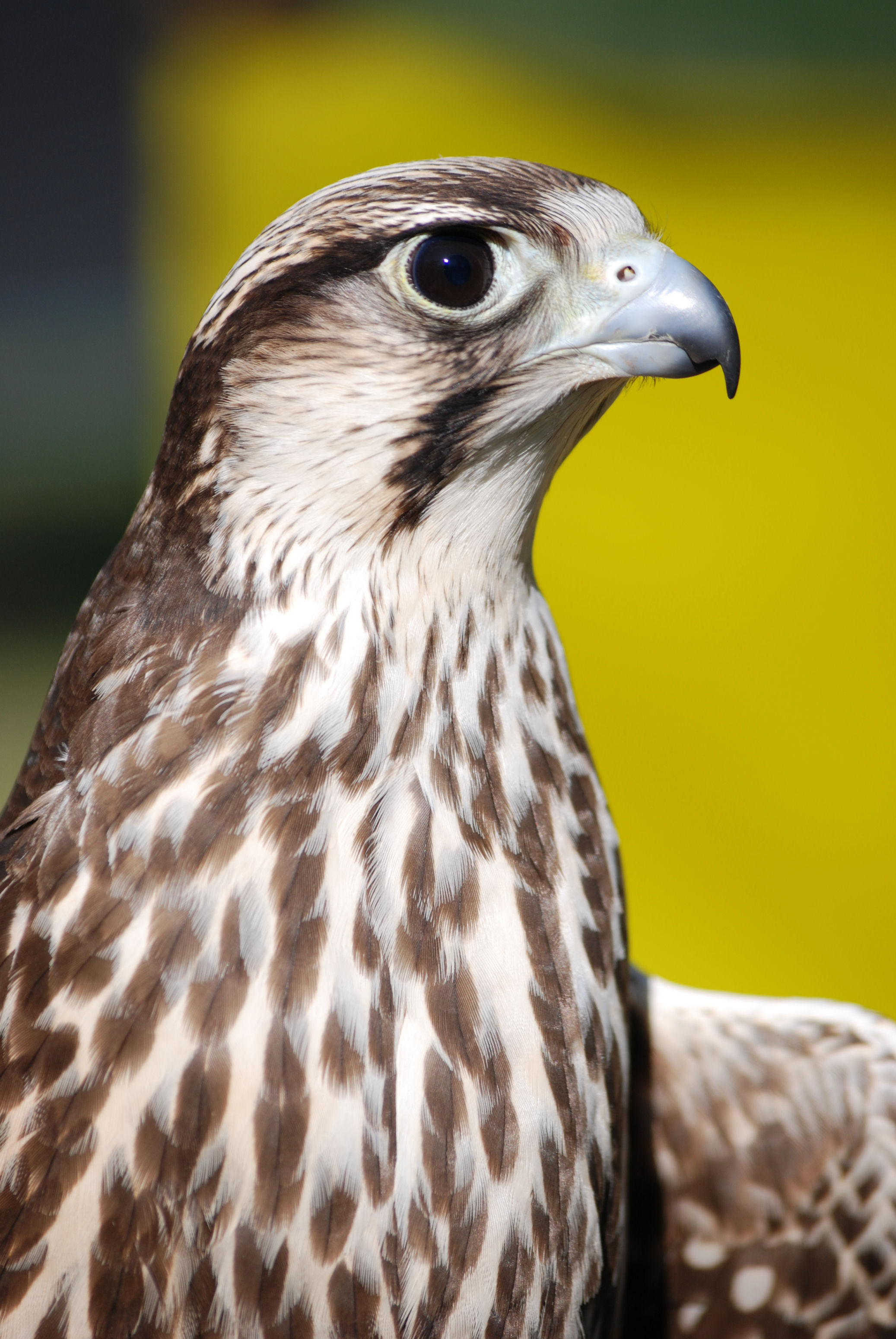
Juvenile, probably F. b. feldeggi. Note blue facial skin and overall similarity to saker falcon.

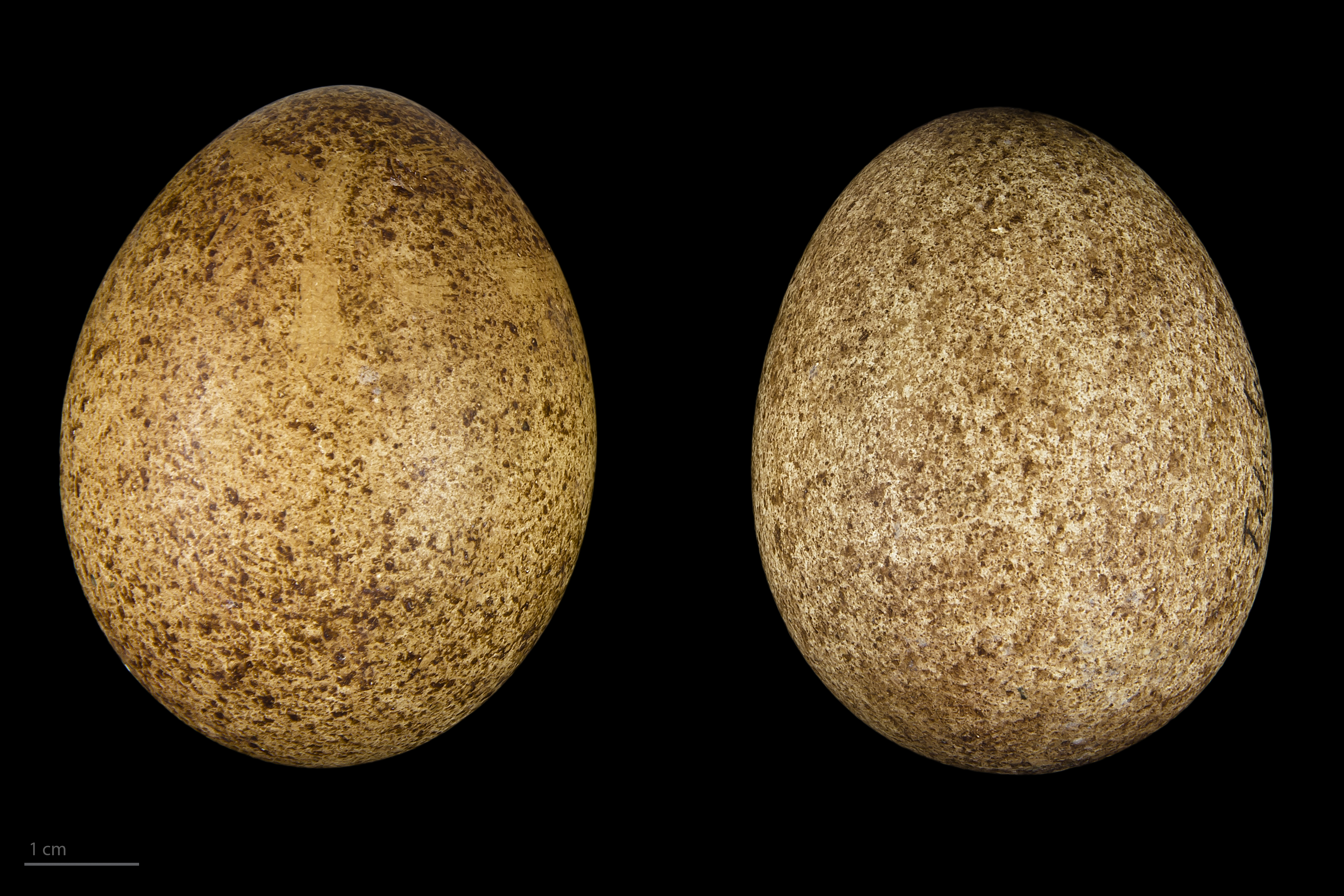
Falco biarmicus feldeggii - MHNT

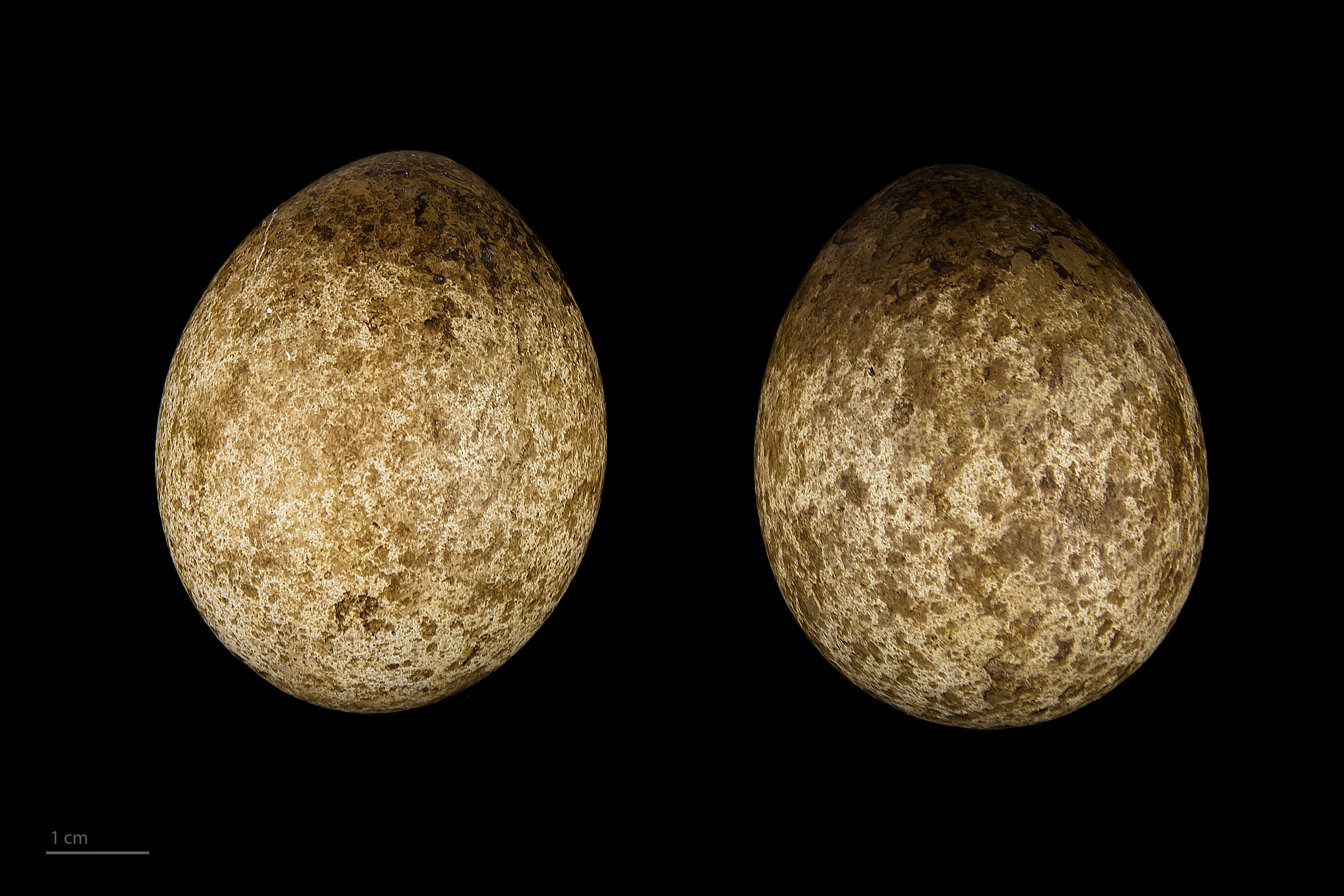
Falco biarmicus erlangeri - MHNT
