= Falco antiquus =

Falco antiquus Temporal range: Middle Pleistocene

Scientific classification
- Domain: Eukaryota
- Kingdom: Animalia
- Phylum: Chordata
- Class: Aves
- Order: Falconiformes
- Family: Falconidae
- Genus: Falco
- Species: F. antiquus

Binomial name
- Falco antiquus Mourer-Chauviré, 1975

Extinct species of bird

Falco antiquus is an extinct species of falcon lived during the Middle Pleistocene in southern Europe. It is thought to be the common ancestor of the modern gyrfalcon and saker falcon.
