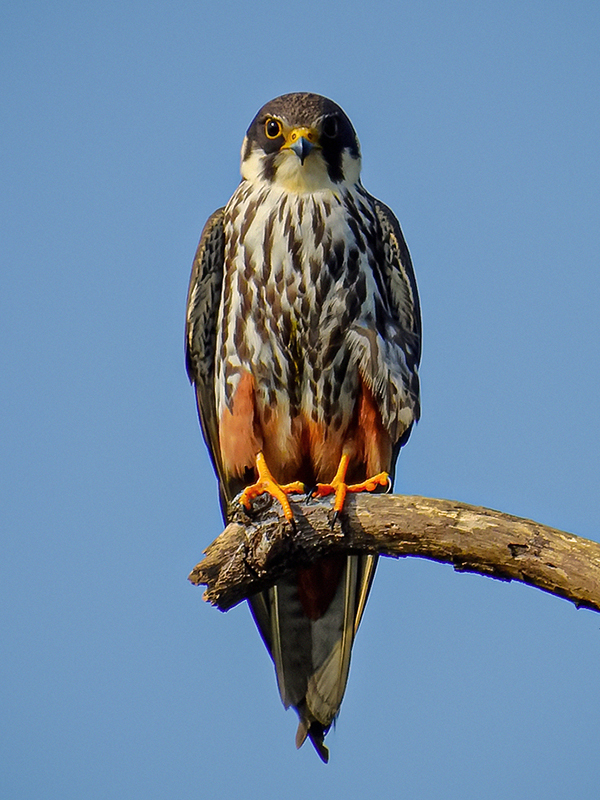
- Eurasian hobby (Falco subbuteo) in Maharashtra, India

Scientific classification
- Kingdom: Animalia
- Phylum: Chordata
- Class: Aves
- Order: Falconiformes
- Family: Falconidae
- Subfamily: Falconinae
- Genus: Falco; Linnaeus, 1758

Type species
- Falco subbuteo Linnaeus, 1758

Species
- 38; see text.

Synonyms
- List: Aesalon; Lithofalco; Tinnunculus Linnaeus, 1766; Hierofalco Cuvier, 1817; Cerchneis Boie, 1826; Hypotriorchis Boie, 1826; Rhynchodon Nitzsch, 1829; Ieracidea Gould, 1838; Hieracidea Strickland, 1841 (unjustified emendation; Gennaia Kaup, 1847; Jerafalco Kaup, 1850 (unjustified emendation); Harpe Bonaparte, 1855 (non Lacepède 1802: preoccupied); Dissodectes Sclater, 1864; Harpa Sharpe, 1874 (non Pallas 1774: preoccupied); Gennadas Heine & Reichenow, 1890 (unjustified emendation); Nesierax Oberholser, 1899; Nesihierax Dubois, 1902 (unjustified emendation); Asturaetus De Vis, 1906 (non Asturaetos Brehm 1855: preoccupied); Plioaetus Richmond, 1908; Sushkinia Tugarinov, 1935 (non Martynov 1930: preoccupied) – see below

= Falcon =

Falcon Temporal range: Late Miocene to present

Birds of prey in the genus Falco

Falcons (/ˈfɒlkən, ˈfɔːl-, ˈfæl-/) are birds of prey in the genus Falco, which includes about 40 species. Some small species of falcons with long, narrow wings are called hobbies, and some that hover while hunting are called kestrels. Falcons are widely distributed on all continents of the world except Antarctica, though closely related raptors did occur there in the Eocene.

Adult falcons have thin, tapered wings, which enable them to fly at high speed and change direction rapidly. Fledgling falcons, in their first year of flying, have longer flight feathers, which make their configuration more like that of a general-purpose bird such as a broadwing. This makes flying easier while still learning the aerial skills required to be effective hunters like the adults.

The falcons are the largest genus in the Falconinae subfamily of Falconidae, which also includes two other subfamilies comprising caracaras and a few other species of "falcons". All these birds kill prey with their beaks, using a tomial "tooth" on the side of their beaks—unlike the hawks, eagles and other larger birds of prey from the unrelated family Accipitridae, who use talons on their feet.

The largest falcon is the gyrfalcon at up to 65 cm (26 in) in length. The smallest falcon species is the Seychelles kestrel, which measures just 15–24 centimetres (5.9–9.4 in). As with hawks and owls, falcons exhibit sexual dimorphism, with the females typically larger than the males, thus allowing a wider range of prey species.

As is the case with many birds of prey, falcons have exceptional powers of vision; the visual acuity of one species has been measured at 2.6 times that of human eyes. They are fast fliers, with the Peregrine falcons having been recorded diving at speeds of 320 km/h (200 mph), making them the fastest-moving creatures on Earth; the fastest recorded dive attained a vertical speed of 390 km/h (240 mph).

== Taxonomy ==
The genus Falco was introduced in 1758 by the Swedish naturalist Carl Linnaeus in the tenth edition of his Systema Naturae. The type species is the merlin (Falco columbarius). The genus name Falco is Late Latin meaning a "falcon" from falx, falcis, meaning "a sickle", referring to the claws of the bird. In Middle English and Old French, the title faucon refers generically to several captive raptor species.

The traditional term for a male falcon is tercel (British spelling) or tiercel (American spelling), from the Latin tertius (third) because of the belief that only one in three eggs hatched a male bird. Some sources give the etymology as deriving from the fact that a male falcon is about one-third smaller than a female (Old French: tiercelet). A falcon chick, especially one reared for falconry, still in its downy stage, is known as an eyas (sometimes spelled eyass). The word arose by mistaken division of Old French un niais, from Latin presumed nidiscus (nestling) from nidus (nest). The technique of hunting with trained captive birds of prey is known as falconry.

Compared to other birds of prey, the fossil record of the falcons is not well distributed in time. For years, the oldest fossils tentatively assigned to this genus were from the Late Miocene, less than 10 million years ago. This coincides with a period in which many modern genera of birds became recognizable in the fossil record. As of 2021, the oldest falconid fossil is estimated to be 55 million years old. Given the distribution of fossil and living Falco taxa, falcons are probably of North American, African, or possibly Middle Eastern or European origin. Falcons are not closely related to other birds of prey, being part of the class Australaves, and their nearest relatives are parrots and songbirds.

=== Overview ===
Falcons are roughly divisible into three or four groups. The first contains the kestrels (probably excepting the American kestrel); usually small and stocky falcons of mainly brown upperside colour and sometimes sexually dimorphic; three African species that are generally gray in colour stand apart from the typical members of this group. The fox and greater kestrels can be told apart at first glance by their tail colours, but not by much else; they might be very close relatives and are probably much closer to each other than the lesser and common kestrels. Kestrels feed chiefly on terrestrial vertebrates and invertebrates of appropriate size, such as rodents, reptiles, or insects.

The second group contains slightly larger (on average) species, the hobbies and relatives. These birds are characterized by considerable amounts of dark slate-gray in their plumage; their malar areas are nearly always black. They feed mainly on smaller birds.

Third are the peregrine falcon and its relatives, variably sized powerful birds that also have a black malar area (except some very light color morphs), and often a black cap, as well. They are very fast birds with a maximum speed of 390 kilometres per hour. Otherwise, they are somewhat intermediate between the other groups, being chiefly medium grey with some lighter or brownish colours on their upper sides. They are, on average, more delicately patterned than the hobbies and, if the hierofalcons are excluded (see below), this group typically contains species with horizontal barring on their undersides. As opposed to the other groups, where tail colour varies much in general but little according to evolutionary relatedness, (Note: For example, tail colour in the common and lesser kestrels is absolutely identical, yet they do not seem closely related.) the tails of the large falcons are quite uniformly dark grey with inconspicuous black banding and small, white tips, though this is probably plesiomorphic. These large Falco species feed on mid-sized birds and terrestrial vertebrates.

Very similar to these, and sometimes included therein, are the four or so species of hierofalcon (literally, "hawk-falcons"). They represent taxa with, usually, more phaeomelanins, which impart reddish or brown colors, and generally more strongly patterned plumage reminiscent of hawks. Their undersides have a lengthwise pattern of blotches, lines, or arrowhead marks.

While these three or four groups, loosely circumscribed, are an informal arrangement, they probably contain several distinct clades in their entirety.

A study of mtDNA cytochrome b sequence data of some kestrels identified a clade containing the common kestrel and related "malar-striped" species, to the exclusion of such taxa as the greater kestrel (which lacks a malar stripe), the lesser kestrel (which is very similar to the common, but also has no malar stripe), and the American kestrel, which has a malar stripe, but its colour pattern – apart from the brownish back – and also the black feathers behind the ear, which never occur in the true kestrels, are more reminiscent of some hobbies. The malar-striped kestrels apparently split from their relatives in the Gelasian, roughly 2.0–2.5 million years ago (Mya), and are seemingly of tropical East African origin. The entire "true kestrel" group—excluding the American species—is probably a distinct and quite young clade, as also suggested by their numerous apomorphies.

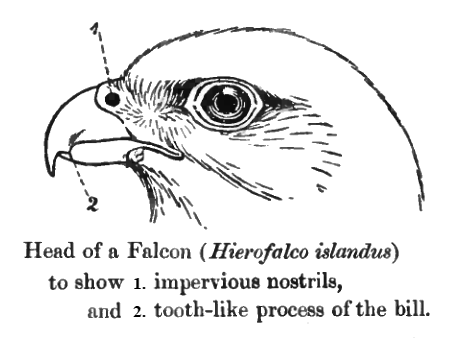
Most members of the genus Falco show a "tooth" on the upper mandible.

Other studies have confirmed that the hierofalcon are a monophyletic group–and that hybridization is quite frequent at least in the larger falcon species. Initial studies of mtDNA cytochrome b sequence data suggested that the hierofalcon are sister to other living falcons. The discovery of a NUMT proved this earlier theory erroneous. In reality, the hierofalcon are a rather young group, originating at the same time as the start of the main kestrel radiation, about 2 Mya. Very little fossil history exists for this lineage. However, the present diversity of very recent origin suggests that this lineage may have nearly gone extinct in the recent past.

The phylogeny and delimitations of the peregrine and hobby groups are more problematic. Molecular studies have only been conducted on a few species, and the morphologically ambiguous taxa have often been little researched. The morphology of the syrinx, which contributes well to resolving the overall phylogeny of the Falconidae, is not very informative in the present genus. Nonetheless, a core group containing the peregrine and Barbary falcons, which, in turn, group with the hierofalcon and the more distant prairie falcon (which was sometimes placed with the hierofalcon, though it is entirely distinct biogeographically), as well as at least most of the "typical" hobbies, are confirmed to be monophyletic as suspected.

Given that the American Falco species of today belong to the peregrine group, or are apparently sister to other species in the clade, the initially most successful evolutionary radiation seemingly was a Holarctic one that originated possibly around central Eurasia or in (northern) Africa. One or several lineages were present in North America by the Early Pliocene at the latest.

The origin of today's major Falco groups—the "typical" hobbies and kestrels, for example, or the peregrine-hierofalcon complex, or the aplomado falcon lineage—can be quite confidently placed from the Miocene-Pliocene boundary through the Zanclean and Piacenzian and just into the Gelasian, that is from 2.4 to 5.3 Mya, when the malar-striped kestrels diversified. Some groups of falcons, such as the hierofalcon complex and the peregrine falcon-Barbary falcon superspecies, have only evolved in more recent times; the species of the former seem to be 120,000 years old or so.

=== Species ===
The sequence follows the taxonomic order of White et al. (1996), except for adjustments in the kestrel sequence.

Image	Common name	Scientific name	Distribution
	Malagasy kestrel	Falco newtoni	Madagascar, Mayotte, and the Comores.
	Seychelles kestrel	Falco araeus	Seychelles Islands
	Mauritius kestrel	Falco punctatus	Mauritius
	Spotted kestrel	Falco moluccensis	Wallacea and Java.
	Nankeen kestrel or Australian kestrel	Falco cenchroides	Australia and New Guinea.
	Common kestrel	Falco tinnunculus	Widespread in Europe, Asia, and Africa, as well as occasionally reaching the east coast of North America.
	Rock kestrel	Falco rupicolus	Northwestern Angola and southern Democratic Republic of Congo to southern Tanzania, and south to South Africa.
	Greater kestrel	Falco rupicoloides	Namibia, Botswana, Zimbabwe, parts of Angola and Zambia and in much of South Africa.
	Fox kestrel	Falco alopex	South of the Sahara from Mali eastwards as far as Ethiopia and north-west Kenya. It occasionally wanders west to Senegal, the Gambia and Guinea and south to the Democratic Republic of the Congo.
	Lesser kestrel	Falco naumanni	Mediterranean across Central Asia into China and Mongolia.
	Grey kestrel	Falco ardosiaceus	Ethiopia, western parts of Kenya and Tanzania.
	Dickinson's kestrel	Falco dickinsoni	Mozambique, Zimbabwe, Zambia and Malawi along with north-eastern South Africa.
	Banded kestrel	Falco zoniventris	Madagascar
	Red-necked falcon	Falco chicquera	Africa, India
	Red-footed falcon	Falco vespertinus	Russia, Ukraine and bordering regions.
	Amur falcon	Falco amurensis	South-eastern Siberia and Northern China.
	Eleonora's falcon	Falco eleonorae	Greece, Cyprus, the Canary Islands, Ibiza and off Spain, Italy, Croatia, Morocco and Algeria.
	Sooty falcon	Falco concolor	Northeastern Africa to the southern Persian Gulf region.
	American kestrel or "sparrow hawk"	Falco sparverius	Central and western Alaska across northern Canada to Nova Scotia, and south throughout North America, into central Mexico and the Caribbean.
	Aplomado falcon	Falco femoralis	Northern Mexico and Trinidad locally to southern South America.
	Merlin or "pigeon hawk"	Falco columbarius	Eurasia, North Africa, North America.
	Bat falcon	Falco rufigularis	Tropical Mexico, Central and South America, and Trinidad
	Orange-breasted falcon	Falco deiroleucus	Southern Mexico to northern Argentina.
	Eurasian hobby	Falco subbuteo	Africa, Europe and Asia.
	African hobby	Falco cuvierii	Angola, Benin, Botswana, Burkina Faso, Burundi, Cameroon, Central African Republic, Chad, Republic of the Congo, Democratic Republic of the Congo, Ivory Coast, Eswatini, Ethiopia, Gabon, Gambia, Ghana, Guinea, Guinea-Bissau, Kenya, Liberia, Malawi, Mali, Mozambique, Namibia, Niger, Nigeria, Rwanda, Senegal, Sierra Leone, Somalia, South Africa, Sudan, Tanzania, Togo, Uganda, Zambia, and Zimbabwe.
	Oriental hobby	Falco severus	Eastern Himalayas and ranges southwards through Indochina to Australasia
	Australian hobby or little falcon	Falco longipennis	Australia
	New Zealand falcon or karearea	Falco novaeseelandiae	New Zealand
	Brown falcon	Falco berigora	Australia and New Guinea.
	Grey falcon	Falco hypoleucos	Australia
	Black falcon	Falco subniger	Australia
	Lanner falcon	Falco biarmicus	Africa, southeast Europe and just into Asia.
	Laggar falcon	Falco jugger	Southeastern Iran, southeastern Afghanistan, Pakistan, through India, Nepal, Bhutan, Bangladesh and northwestern Myanmar.
	Saker falcon	Falco cherrug	Eastern Europe, the Middle East, Central Asia and China.
	Gyrfalcon	Falco rusticolus	Eastern and western Greenland, Canada, Alaska, Iceland and Norway.
	Prairie falcon	Falco mexicanus	Western North America.
	Peregrine falcon or "duck hawk"	Falco peregrinus	Cosmopolitan
	Taita falcon	Falco fasciinucha	Kenya

=== Extinct species ===
- Réunion kestrel, Falco duboisi – extinct (about 1700)

=== Fossil record ===
- Falco medius (Late Miocene of Cherevichnyi, Ukraine) (Note: IZAN 45-4033: left carpometacarpus. Small species; possibly closer to kestrels than to peregrine lineage or hierofalcons, but may be more basal altogether due to its age)
- ?Falco sp. (Late Miocene of Idaho) (Note: IMNH 27937. A coracoid of a merlin-sized species. It does not seem close to F. columbarius or the Recent North American species (Becker 1987).)
- Falco sp. (Early Pliocene of Kansas)
- Falco sp. (Early Pliocene of Bulgaria – Early Pleistocene of Spain and Czech Republic) (Note: A hierofalcon (Mlíkovský 2002)? If so, probably not close to the living species, but an earlier divergence that left no descendants; might be more than one species due to large range in time and/or include common ancestor of hierofalcons and peregrine-Barbary complex (Nittinger et al. 2005).)
- Falco oregonus (Early/Middle Pliocene of Fossil Lake, Oregon) – possibly not distinct from a living species
- Falco umanskajae (Late Pliocene of Kryzhanovka, Ukraine) – includes "Falco odessanus", a nomen nudum
- ?Falco bakalovi (Late Pliocene of Varshets, Bulgaria)
- Falco antiquus (Middle Pleistocene of Noailles, France and possibly Horvőlgy, Hungary) (Note: Supposedly a saker falcon paleosubspecies (Mlíkovský 2002), but this is not too likely due to the probable Eemian origin of that species.)
- Cuban kestrel, Falco kurochkini (Late Pleistocene/Holocene of Cuba, West Indies)
- Falco chowi (China)
- Falco bulgaricus (Late Miocene of Hadzhidimovo, Bulgaria)

Several more paleosubspecies of extant species have also been described; see species accounts for these.

"Sushkinia" pliocaena from the Early Pliocene of Pavlodar (Kazakhstan) appears to be a falcon of some sort. It might belong in this genus or a closely related one. In any case, the genus name Sushkinia is invalid for this animal because it had already been allocated to a prehistoric dragonfly relative. In 2015 the bird genus was renamed Psushkinia.

The supposed "Falco" pisanus was actually a pigeon of the genus Columba, possibly the same as Columba omnisanctorum, which, in that case, would adopt the older species name of the "falcon". The Eocene fossil "Falco" falconellus (or "F." falconella) from Wyoming is a bird of uncertain affiliations, maybe a falconid, maybe not; it certainly does not belong in this genus. "Falco" readei is now considered a paleosubspecies of the yellow-headed caracara (Daptrius chimachima).

== See also ==
- Ra
- Horus
- Khonsu
