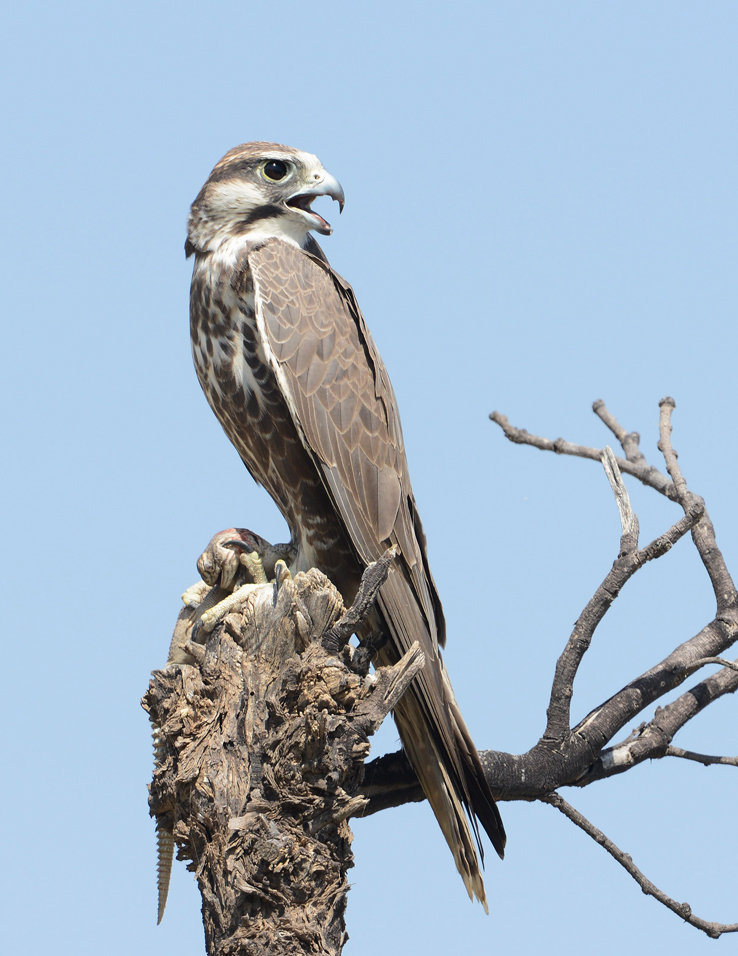
- In Rajasthan, India

Conservation status
- Near Threatened (IUCN 3.1)
- CITES Appendix I

Scientific classification
- Kingdom: Animalia
- Phylum: Chordata
- Class: Aves
- Order: Falconiformes
- Family: Falconidae
- Genus: Falco
- Subgenus: Hierofalco
- Species: F. jugger

Binomial name
- Falco jugger Gray, 1834

= Laggar falcon =

Species of bird

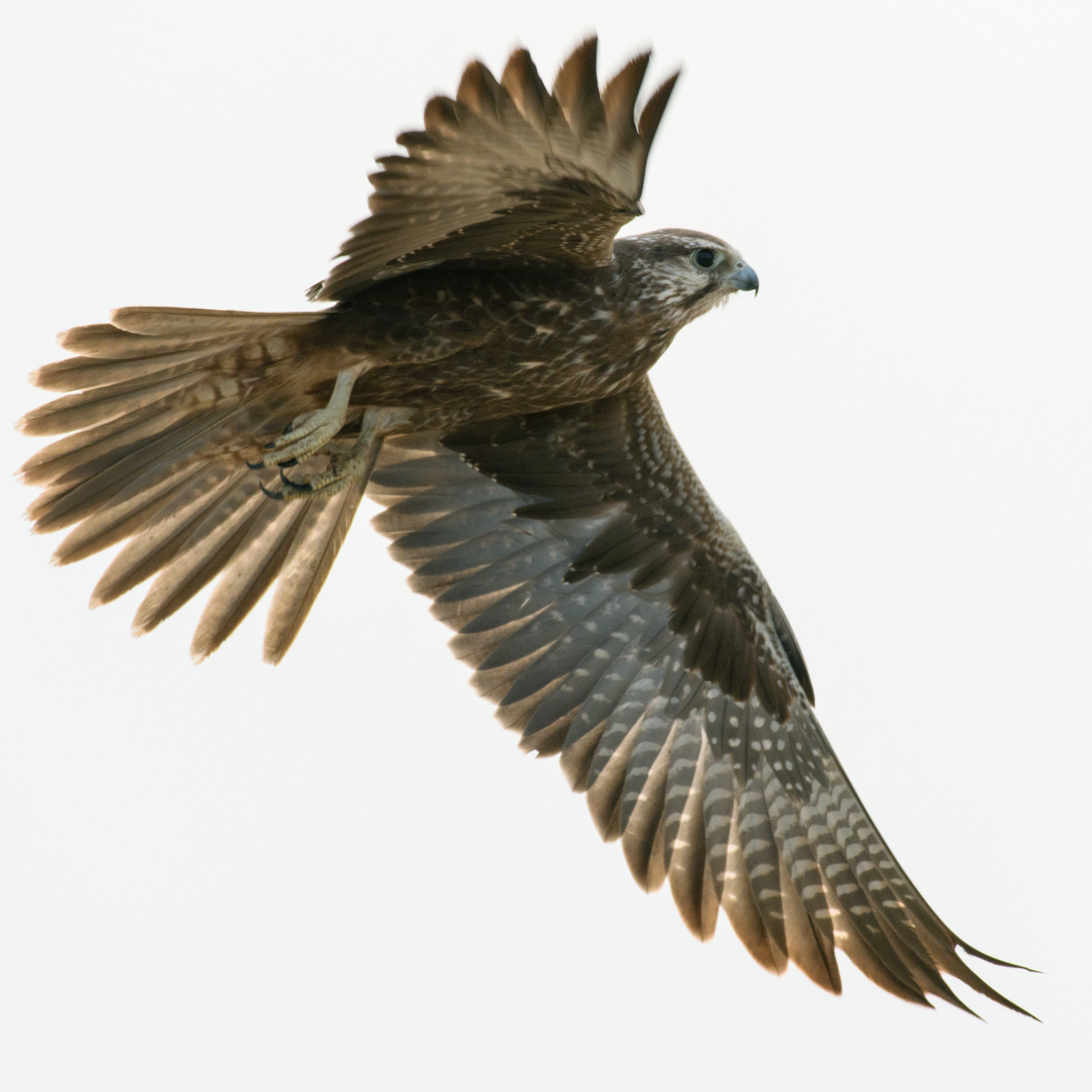
Juvenile laggar falcon in flight

The laggar falcon (Falco jugger) is a mid-sized bird of prey occurring in the Indian subcontinent from southeastern Iran, southeastern Afghanistan, Pakistan, through India, Nepal, Bhutan, Bangladesh and northwestern Myanmar. It used to be one of the most common falcons in the region, but numbers have declined so that is probably nowhere a common species anymore. The main threats are the intensification of pesticide use and use as a decoy to trap large falcons.

Fledglings have an almost entirely dark underside, and first-year subadult birds still retain much dark on the belly. Adults are dark overall and have blackish tibiotarsus feathers.

The laggar falcon belongs to a close-knit complex of falcons known as hierofalcons. This group exhibits evidence for rampant hybridization and incomplete lineage sorting which confounds analyses of DNA sequence. The radiation of the hierofalcons has likely taken place in the Eemian interglacial at the start of the Late Pleistocene about 130,000–115,000 years ago. The laggar falcon represents a lineage that arrived at its present range out of eastern Africa by way of the Arabian Peninsula which during that time had a more humid climate than today.
