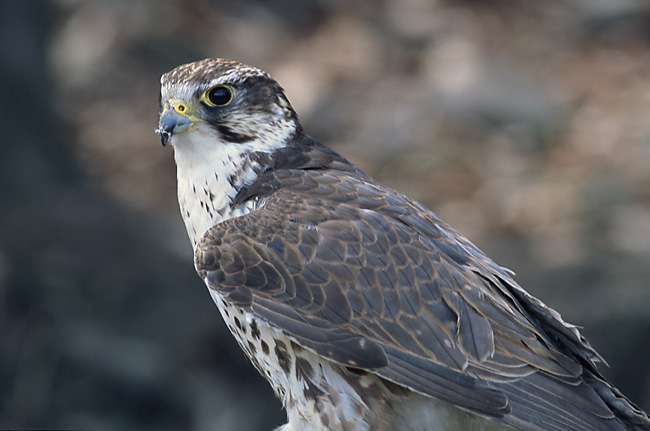
- In China

Conservation status
- Endangered (IUCN 3.1)

Scientific classification
- Kingdom: Animalia
- Phylum: Chordata
- Class: Aves
- Order: Falconiformes
- Family: Falconidae
- Genus: Falco
- Subgenus: Hierofalco
- Species: F. cherrug

Binomial name
- Falco cherrug Gray, JE, 1834
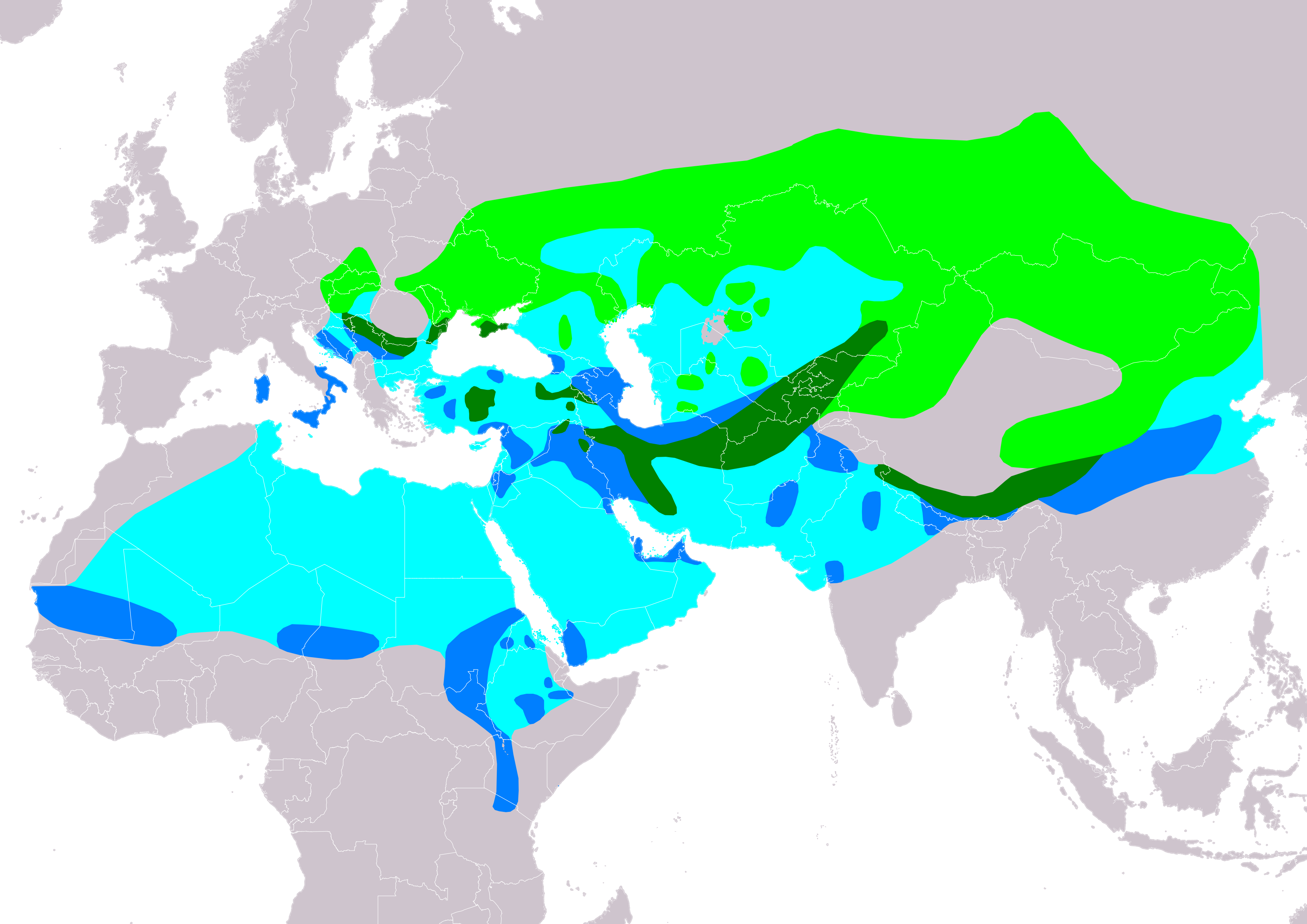
- Range of F. cherrug Breeding Resident Passage Non-breeding

Synonyms
- Falco altaicus (Menzbier, 1891); Hierofalco altaicus (Menzbier, 1891)

= Saker falcon =

Species of bird

The saker falcon (Falco cherrug) is a large falcon species. It breeds from Central Europe eastwards across the Palearctic to Manchuria. It is a partial migrant, which means that some part of the population is migratory, some part is not. In Europe, for example, a part of the juveniles are migrating, while adults are mostly resident. The European and West Asian migratory sakers spend the winter in the Sahel region. On migration, they cross the Middle East, the Arabian Peninsula, and Pakistan, where they are exposed to illegal trapping. The migratory birds to the east from Altai Mountains spend the winter in the Qinghai-Tibet Plateau.

The saker falcon is the second fastest bird in level flight after the white-throated needletail swift (unconfirmed), capable of reaching 150 km/h (93 mph). It is also the third fastest animal in the world overall after the peregrine falcon and the golden eagle, with all three species capable of executing high speed dives known as "stooping", approaching 300 km/h (190 mph). The saker falcon is the national bird of Hungary, the United Arab Emirates, and Mongolia. It is called by Arabs Hur, i.e., "Free-bird", and it has been used in falconry in the Arabian Peninsula since ancient times. They are the national emblem of many Arab countries.

== Taxonomy and systematics ==
This species belongs to the close-knit hierofalcon complex. In this group, there is ample evidence for rampant hybridization and incomplete lineage sorting which confounds analyses of DNA sequence data to a massive extent; molecular studies with small sample sizes can simply not be expected to yield reliable conclusions in the entire hierofalcon group. The radiation of the entire living diversity of hierofalcons seems to have taken place in the Eemian interglacial at the start of the Late Pleistocene, a mere 130,000–115,000 years ago; the saker falcon represents a lineage that expanded out of northeastern Africa into the interior of southeastern Europe and Asia, by way of the eastern Mediterranean region.

The Saker Falcon has four officially recognized subspecies in the international ornithology according to IOC World Bird List:

- F.c. cherrug - the nominate subspecies distributed from Central Europe to Central Asia;
- F.c. coatsi - a subspecies of the desert regions of West and South Kazakhstan and Uzbekistan;
- F.c. milvipes - the typical subspecies widespread in most parts of Central Asia;
- F.c. hendersoni - the subspecies of high elevations of Tibet and the Qinghai Plateau.

Some saker falcons at the northeast edge of the range in the Altai Mountains are slightly larger, and darker and more heavily spotted on the underparts. These, known as the Altai falcon, have been treated in the past either as a distinct species "Falco altaicus" or as a hybrid between saker falcon and gyrfalcon. However, modern opinion (e.g. (Orta 1994)) treats them as a form of saker falcons and new research in population genetics and ecology supports that view. According to a recent study, Altai falcons are genetically intermingled with the broader Asian Saker population and do not constitute a distinct cluster, indicating that they are only colour morphs, and do not represent a separate taxonomic entity.

In captivity, lanners and sakers can interbreed, and gyrfalcon-saker hybrids are also available (see bird flu experiment described in "Ecology and status"). The specific name, cherrug, comes from the Sindhi name charg for a female saker. The common name saker comes from the (Arabic: صقر, romanized: Ṣaqr) meaning "falcon".

== Description ==
The saker falcon is a large hierofalcon, larger than the lanner falcon and almost as large as gyrfalcon at 45–57 cm (18–22 in) length with a wingspan of 97–126 cm (38–50 in). Males weigh between 730–990 g (26–35 oz) and females 970–1,300 g (34–46 oz). It resembles a larger but browner Gyrfalcon. It is larger and more heavily built than the related Lanner Falcon.

Saker falcons tend to have variable plumage. Males and females are similar, except in size, as are young birds, although these tend to be darker and more heavily streaked. The call is a sharp kiy-ee or a repeated kyak-kyak-kyak.

== Ecology ==
The saker falcon is a raptor of open grasslands preferably with some trees or cliffs. It often hunts by horizontal pursuit, rather than the peregrine's stoop from a height, and feeds mainly on rodents and birds. In Europe, ground squirrels and feral pigeons are the most common prey items. This species usually builds no nest of own, but lays its 3–6 eggs in an old stick nest in a tree which was previously used by other birds such as storks, ravens or buzzards. It also often nests on cliffs.

Saker nests support a species-rich assemblage of commensal insects.

== Status and conservation ==
BirdLife International categorises this bird as endangered, due to a rapid population decline, particularly on the central Asian breeding grounds. Ever since the collapse of the Soviet Union, the United Arab Emirates have been the main destination for thousands of falcons caught and sold illegally for hefty sums at the black market. Kazakhstan is estimated to lose up to 1,000 saker falcons per year.

The species also faces pressure from habitat loss and destruction. The population was estimated to be between 7,200 and 8,800 mature individuals in 2004. However, sakers live at low densities across large ranges in remote regions, making distribution status difficult to assess. A climatic niche modelling study pinpointed certain remote areas for targeted population surveys. In the United States, Canada and Europe there are several captive breeding projects. The most dramatic decline of the saker falcon in Asia has been in Kazakhstan and Uzbekistan. In contrast, a strongly protected and relatively abundant population persists in Hungary.

Saker falcons are known to be very susceptible to avian influenza, individuals having been found infected with highly pathogenic H5N1 (in Saudi Arabia) and H7N7 (in Italy) strains. Therefore, an experiment was done with hybrid gyr-saker falcons, which found that five falcons vaccinated with a commercial H5N2 influenza vaccine survived infection with a highly pathogenic H5N1 strain, whereas five unvaccinated falcons died. This means that sakers could be protected from bird flu by vaccination, at least in captivity.

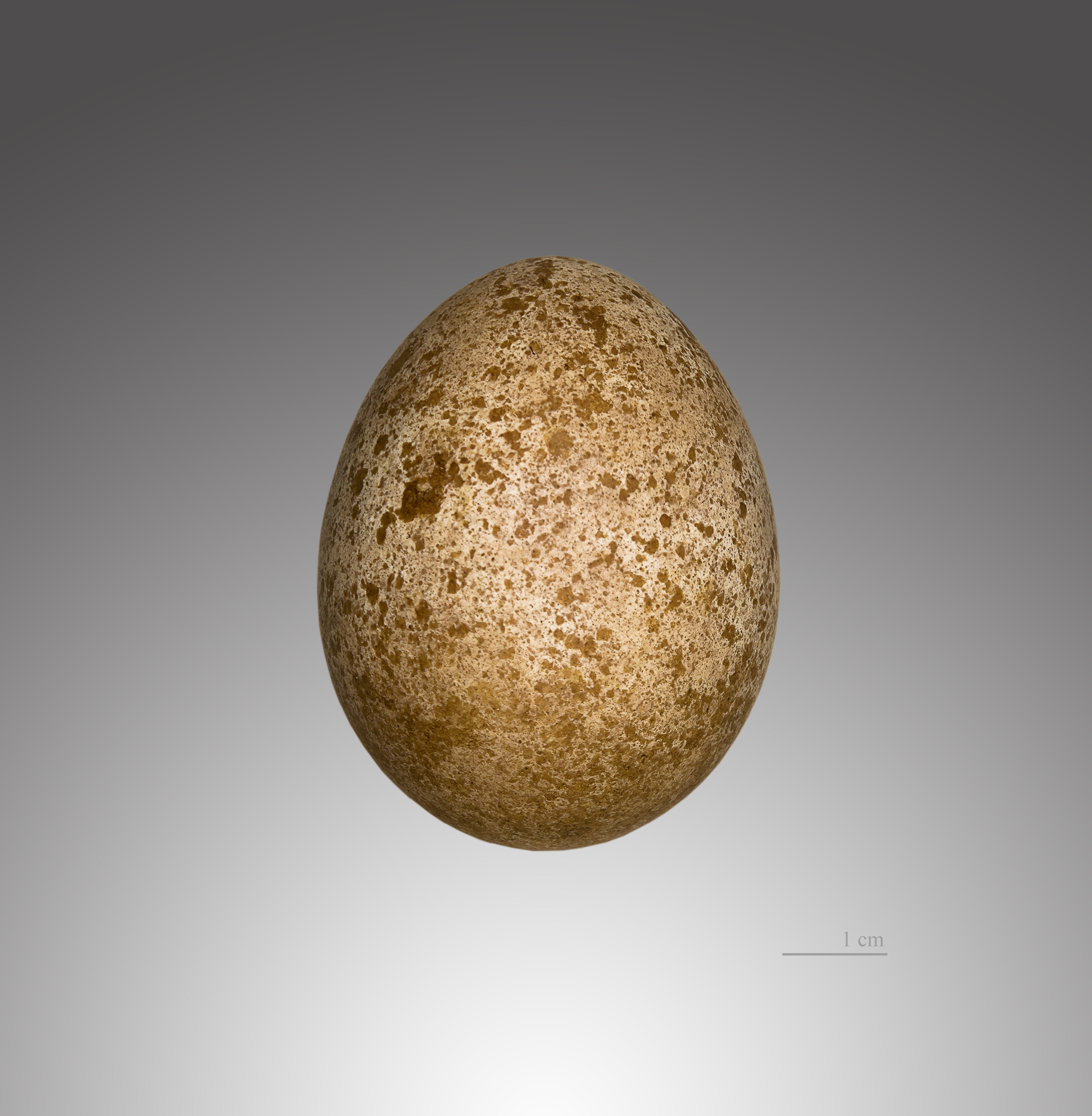
Egg

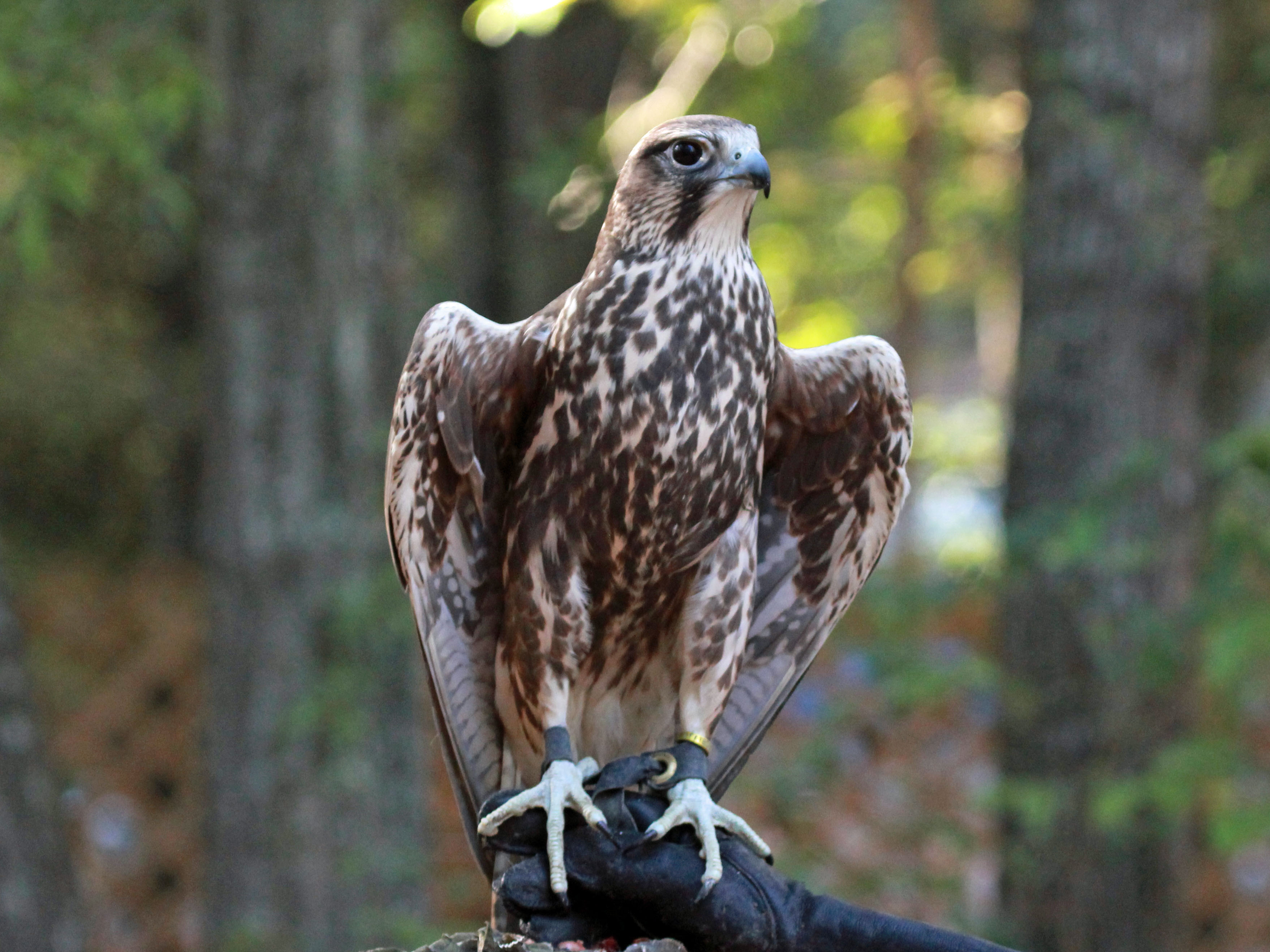
Captive, Carolina Raptor Center, United States

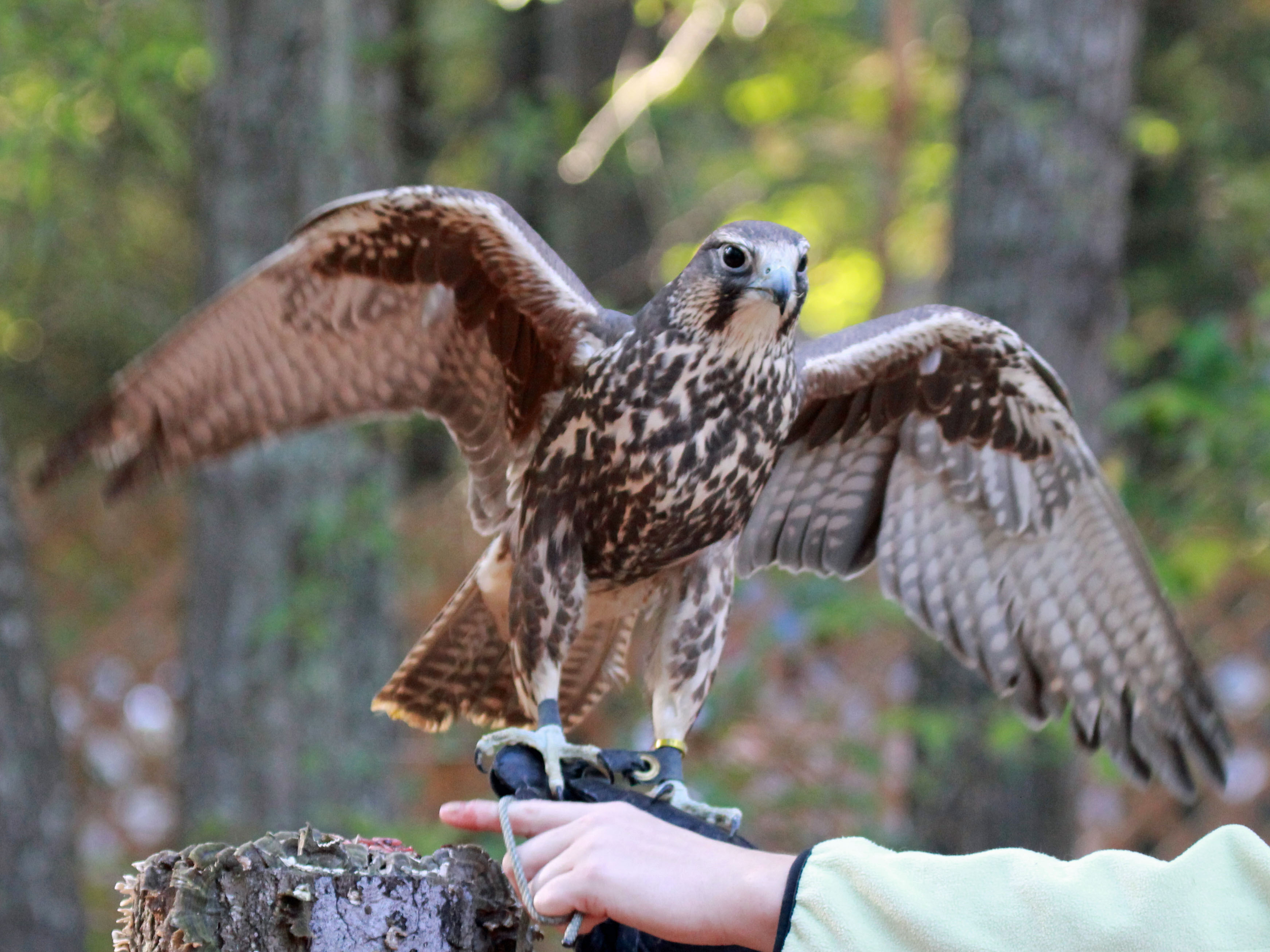
Captive, Carolina Raptor Center

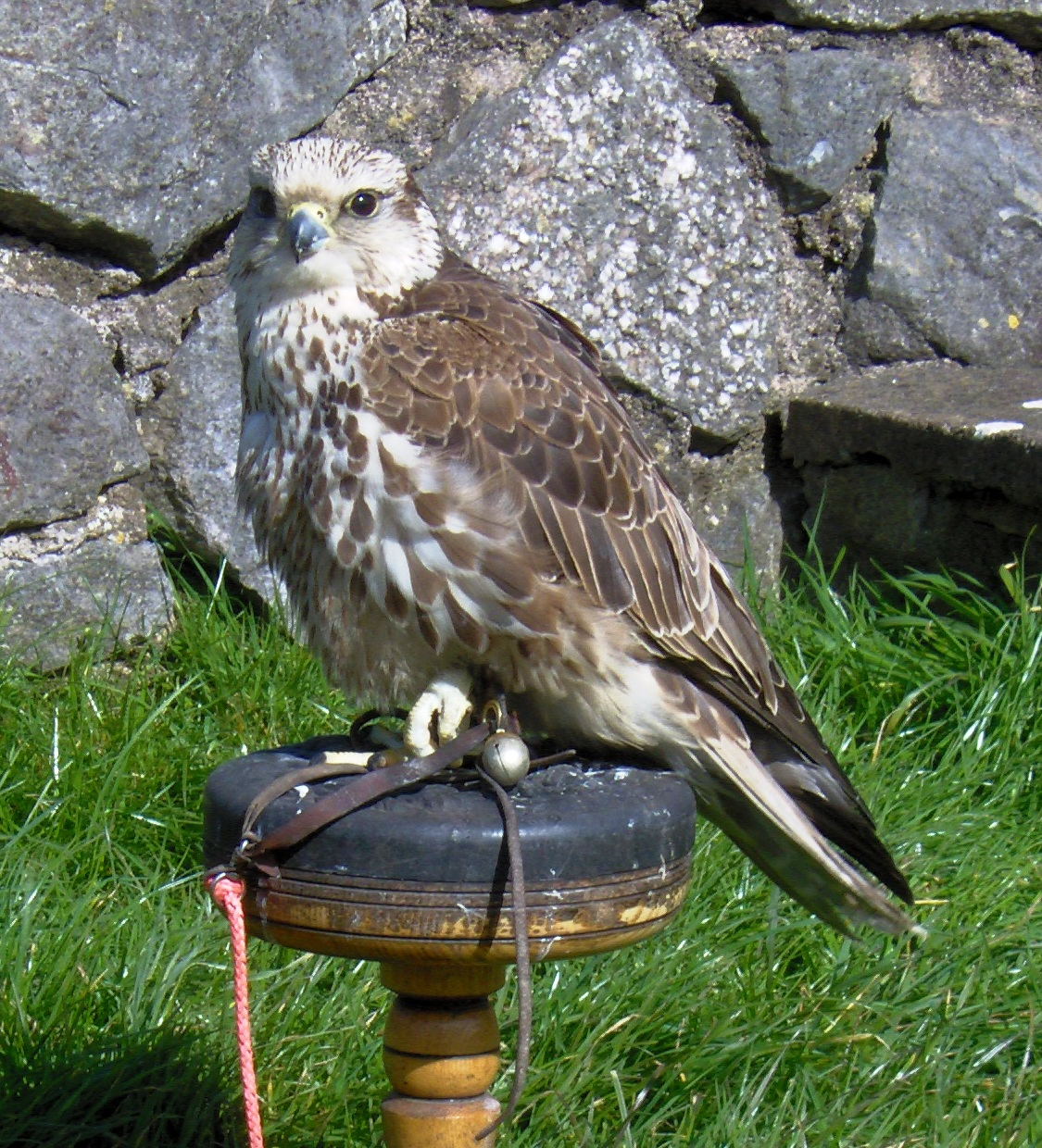
Captive bird, Chew Valley Lake, England

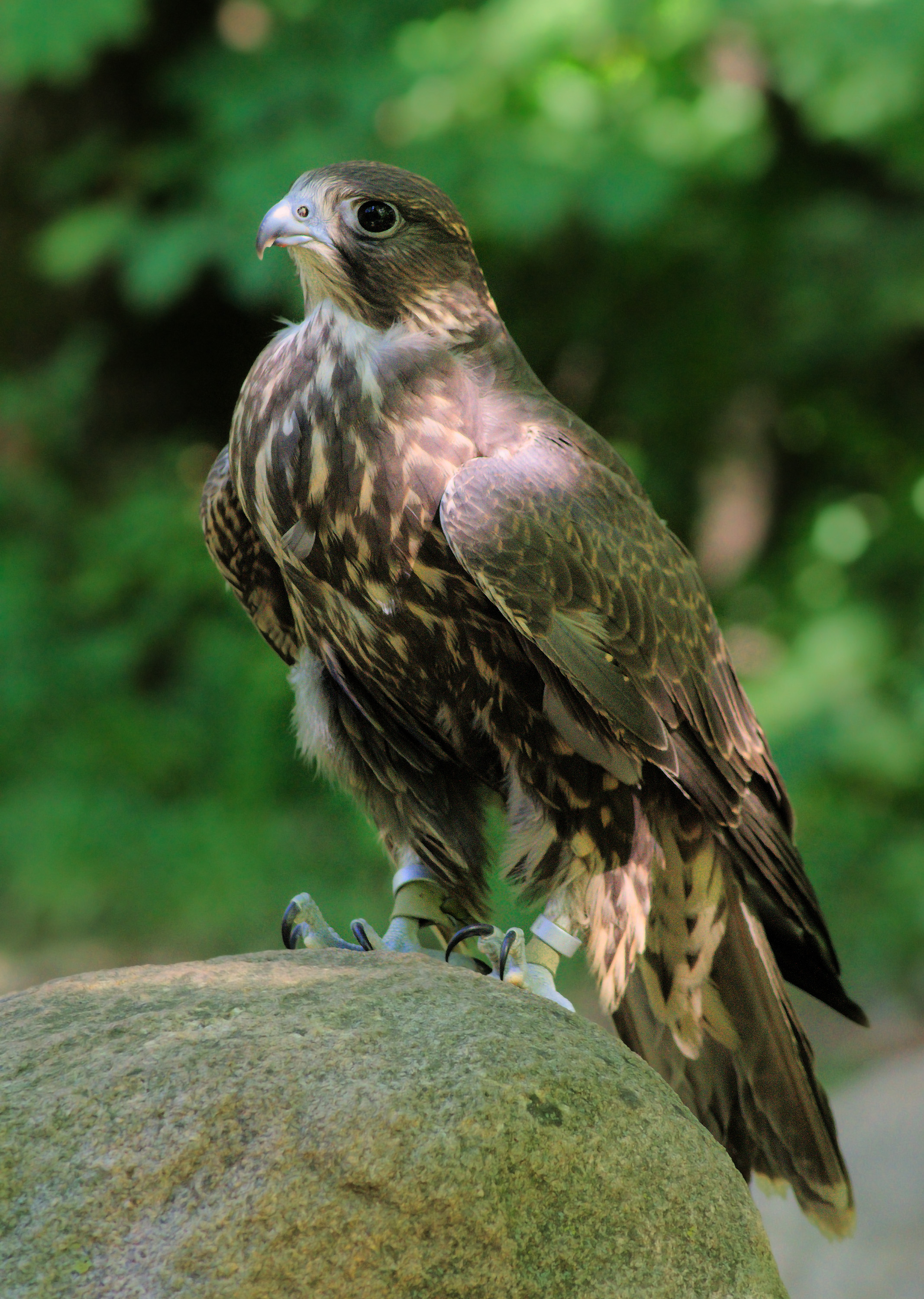
Falcon training in Moscow

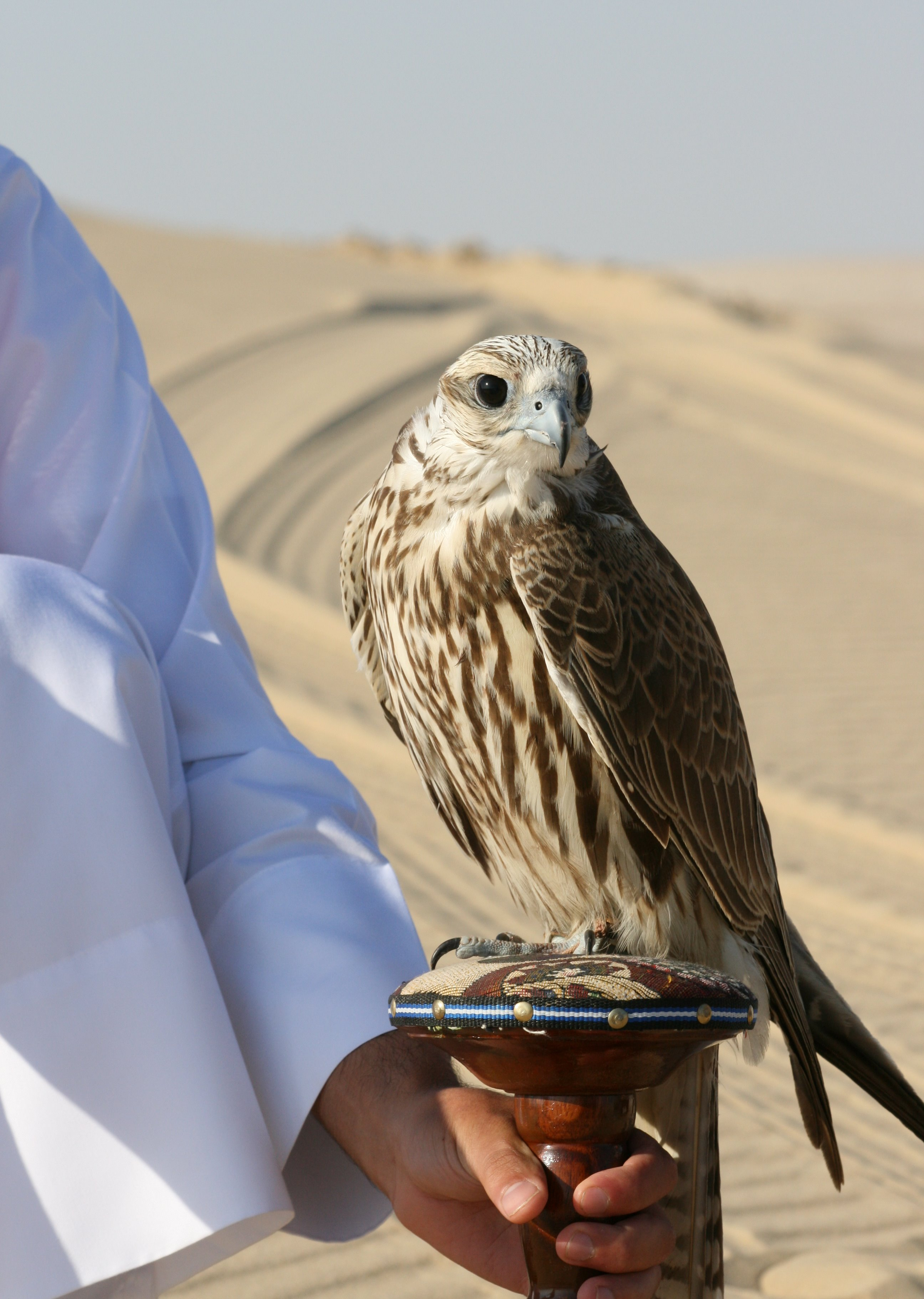
Captive bird, Doha, Qatar

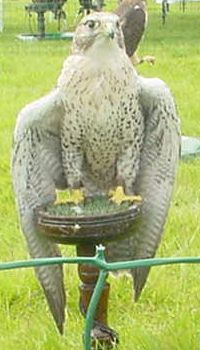
Captive bird

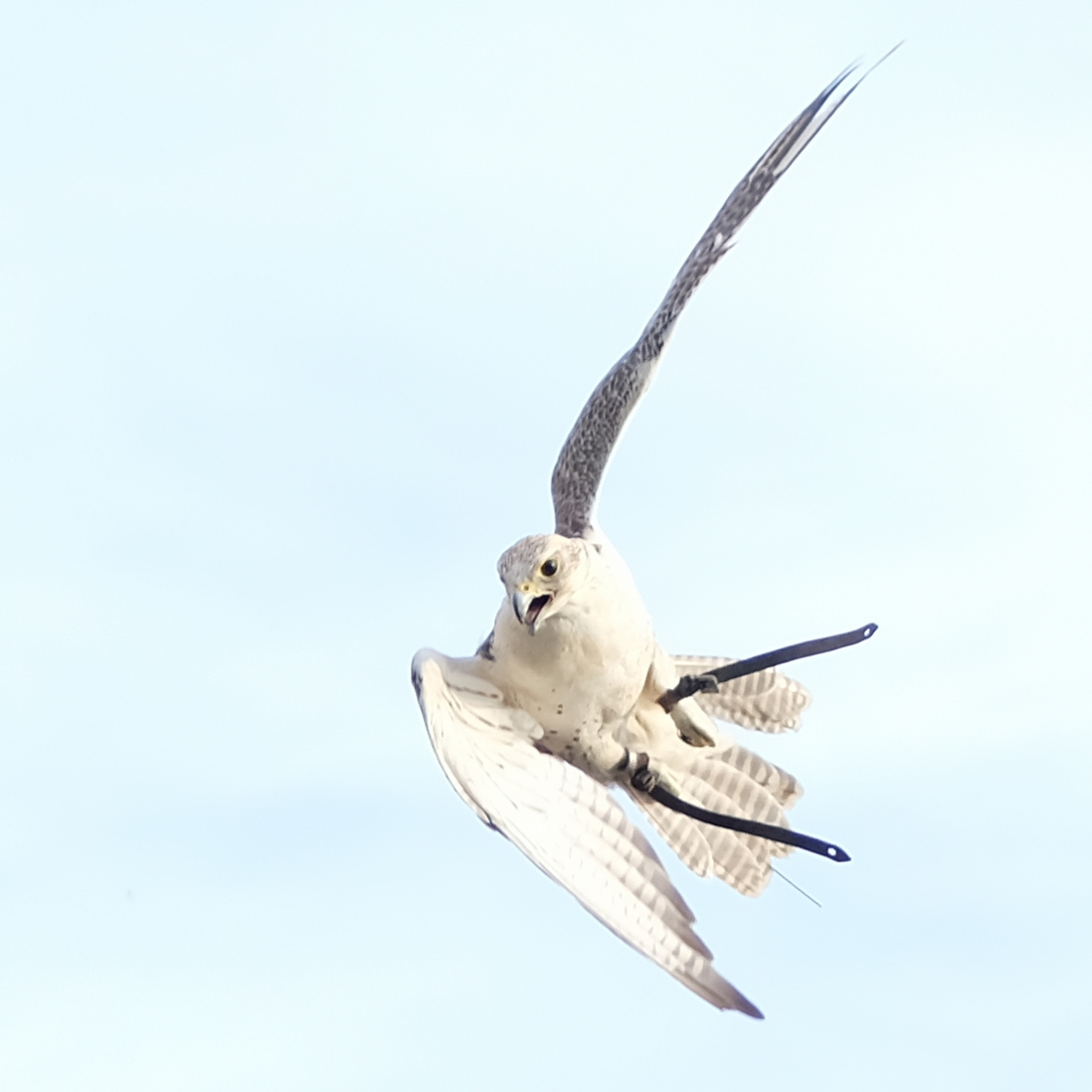
Flying bird at bird show

== In culture ==
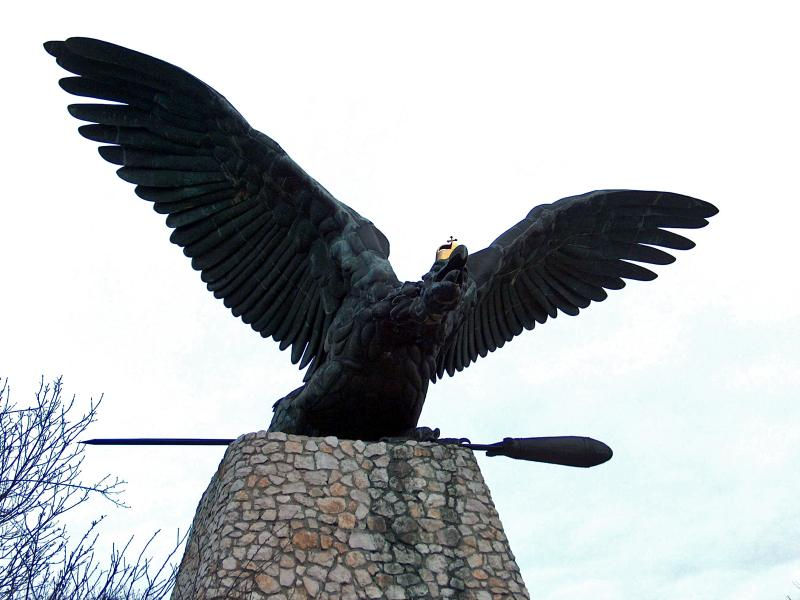
A saker falcon (Turul) monument at Tatabánya, Hungary.

A Hungarian mythological bird, the Turul, was probably a saker falcon (kerecsensólyom), and the saker falcon is the national bird of Hungary. In 2012, the saker falcon was selected as the national bird of Mongolia.

=== Use in falconry ===
The saker falcon has been used in falconry for thousands of years, and like its very close relative, the gyrfalcon, is highly regarded in it. Swift and powerful, it is effective against medium-sized to large-sized game bird species. Saker falcons can reach speeds of 120 to 150 km/h and suddenly swoop down on their prey. The saker falcon and peregrine falcon can be hybridised to provide falcons used in the control of larger birds considered pests.
