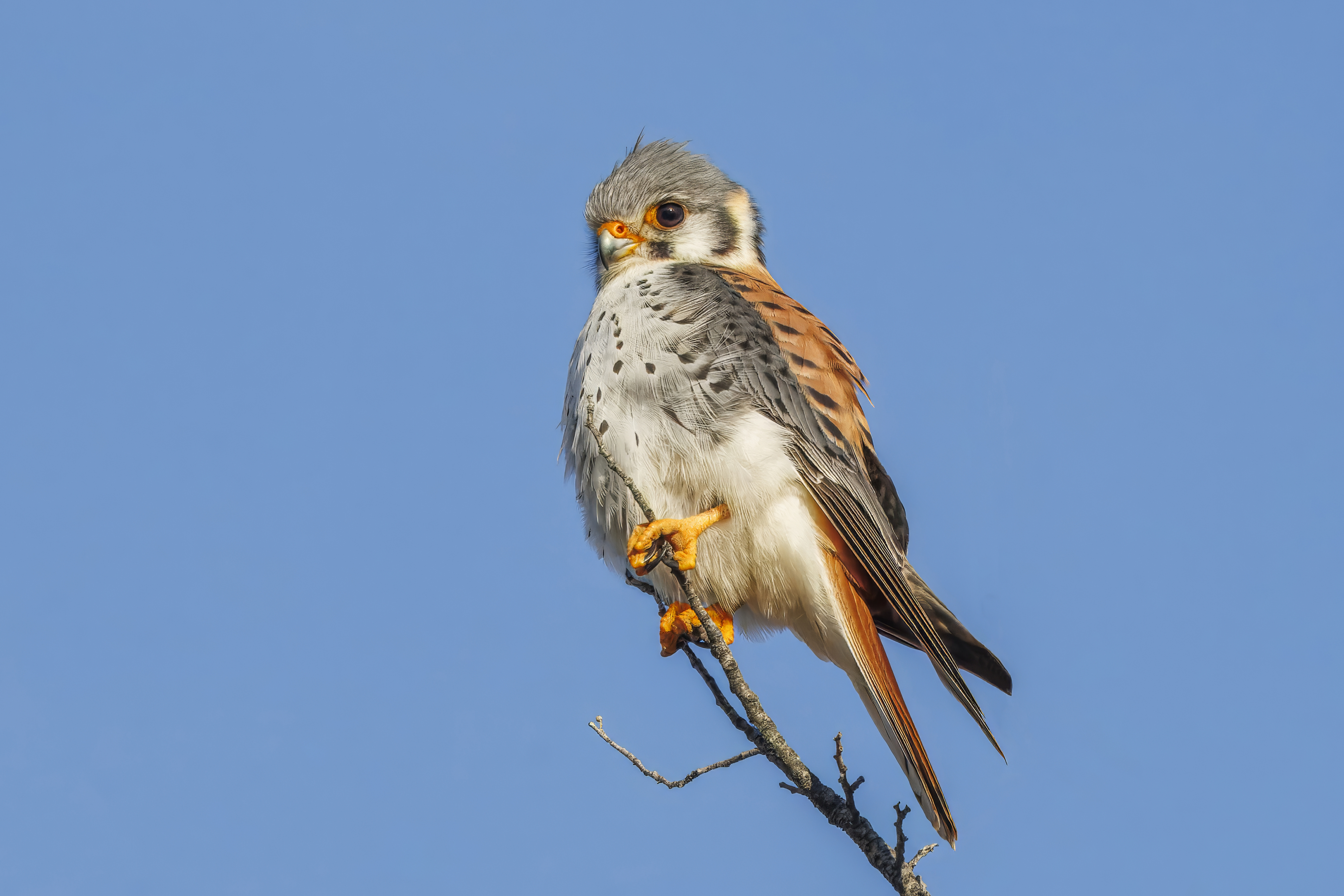
- Male American kestrel

Scientific classification
- Kingdom: Animalia
- Phylum: Chordata
- Class: Aves
- Order: Falconiformes
- Family: Falconidae
- Subfamily: Falconinae
- Genus: Falco; Linnaeus, 1758

Species
- See § Groups

= Kestrel =

Common name for several species of the falcon genus, Falco

The term kestrel (from French: crécerelle, derivative from crécelle, i.e. ratchet) is the common name used for 14 extant species of predatory birds in the falcon genus Falco. Kestrels are most easily distinguished by their typical hunting behaviour which is to hover at a height of around 10–20 metres (35–65 ft) over open country and swoop down on ground prey, usually small mammals, lizards or large insects, as compared to the other species within Falco (with common names falcon and hobby) that are more adapted for active hunting during flight.

== Description ==
Most species termed kestrels appear to form a distinct clade among the falcons, as suggested by comparison of mtDNA cytochrome b sequence data and morphology. This seems to have diverged from other Falco around the Miocene–Pliocene boundary (Messinian to Zanclean, or about 7–3.5 mya). Three species from Africa and its surroundings are sister to all remaining "true" kestrels; these species lack a malar stripe, and in one case have—like other falcons but unlike other true kestrels—large areas of grey in their wings.

Approximately during the Gelasian age (Late Pliocene or Early Pleistocene, around 2.5–2 mya), the main lineage of true kestrels emerged; this contains the species characterized by a malar stripe. This too seems to have evolved in Africa and subsequently spread across the Old World until they reached Australia some time during the Middle Pleistocene, less than one million years ago. This group contains several taxa found on Indian Ocean islands. A group of three predominantly grey species from Africa and Madagascar are usually considered kestrels due to their general shape and habits, but are probably distinct from the true kestrels as outlined above.

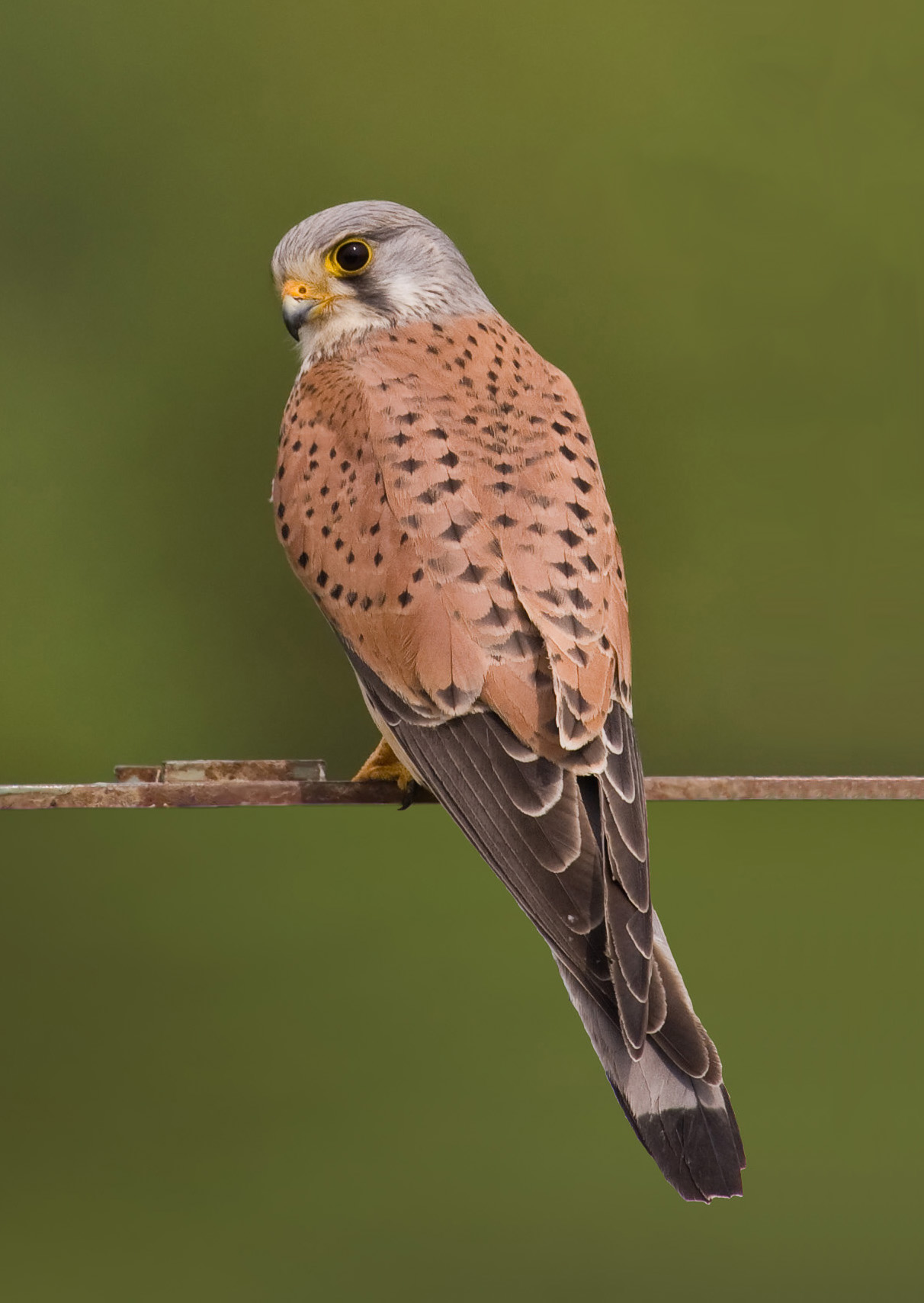
Common kestrel

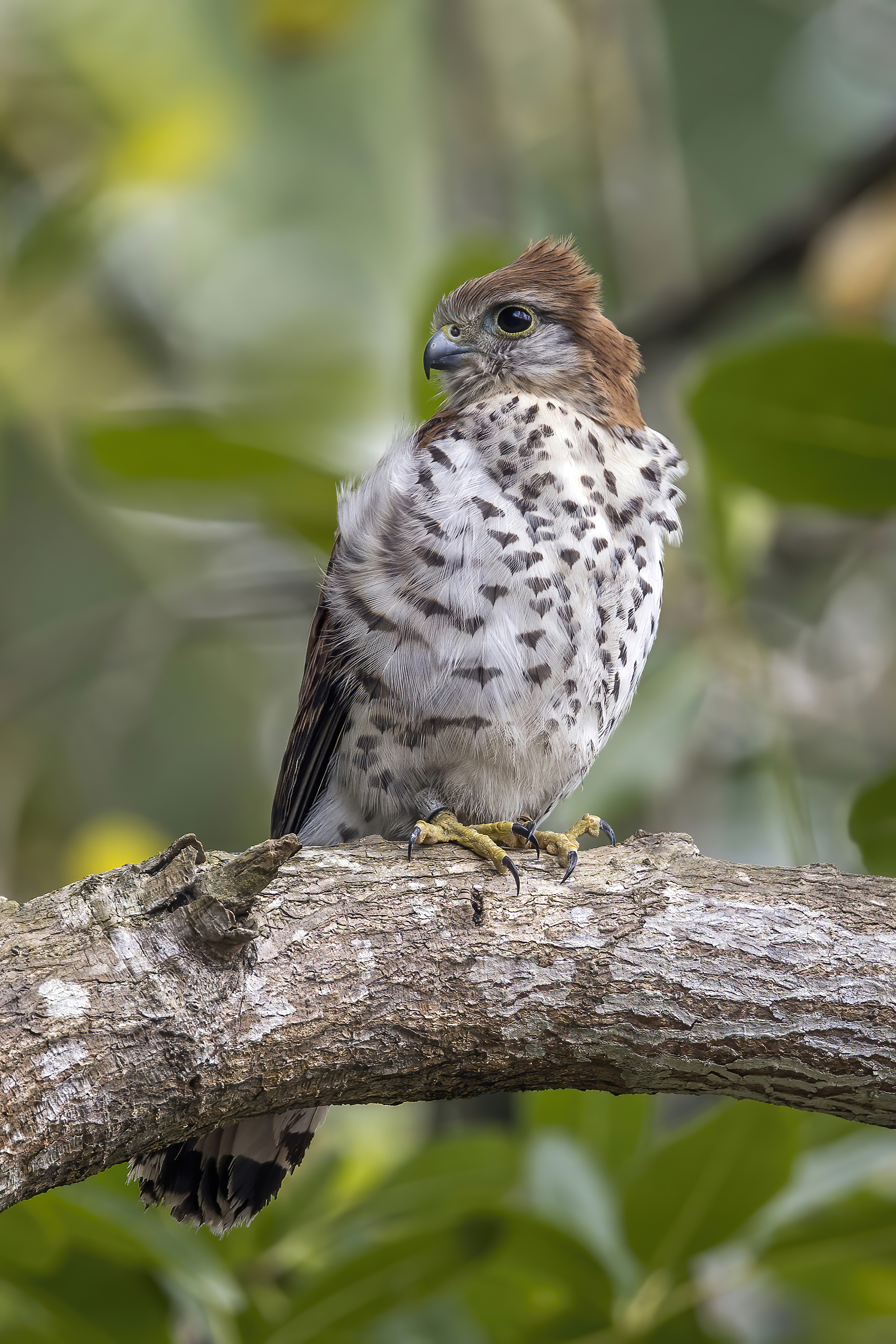
Endangered Mauritius kestrel

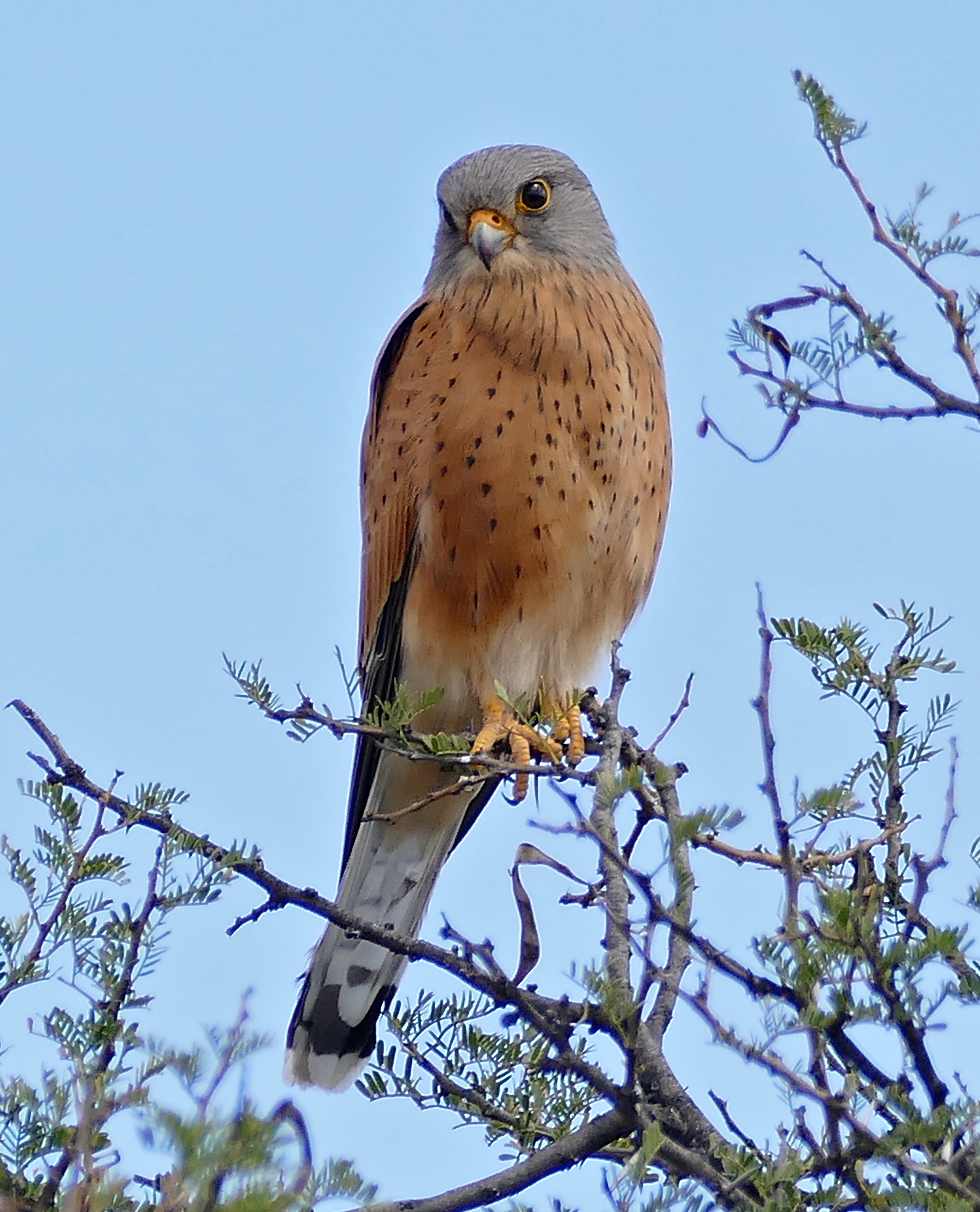
Rock kestrel

The American kestrel is the only New World species termed "kestrel". The molecular data of Groombridge as well as morphological peculiarities (like grey wings in males and a black ear-spot) and biogeography, strongly support the view that this species, among the Falco falcons, is not a kestrel at all in the phylogenetic sense but perhaps closer to the hobbies. Other recent DNA analysis takes a similar view that the American kestrel is not a true kestrel, but rather than being linked to the hobbies is more likely genetically more closely related to the larger American falcons such as the peregrine falcon, the aplomado falcon, and prairie falcon. Though the species has not been renamed as a result of these genetic analyses, it is thus likely a descendant of archaic larger falcon ancestors evolved through a process of convergent evolution to fit a similar small prey niche in the ecosystem as the true kestrels.

== Groups ==
Malar-striped clade or common kestrel group

- Malagasy kestrel, Falco newtoni
- Seychelles kestrel, Falco araeus
- Mauritius kestrel, Falco punctatus
- Réunion kestrel, Falco duboisi – extinct (c.1700)
- Spotted kestrel, Falco moluccensis, found in Indonesia
- Nankeen kestrel or Australian kestrel, Falco cenchroides, found in Australia and New Guinea
- Common kestrel or Eurasian kestrel, Falco tinnunculus, found in Europe, Asia, and Africa
- Rock kestrel, Falco rupicolus, found in South Africa

Basal lineage(s) of true kestrels

- Greater kestrel, Falco rupicoloides, found in Eastern to South Africa
- Fox kestrel, Falco alopex, found in Equatorial Africa
- Lesser kestrel, Falco naumanni, found in southern Europe, India, and most of Africa except for the Sahara and equatorial forest areas

African grey kestrels (a more distant group)

- Grey kestrel, Falco ardosiaceus, found in Central to Southern Africa
- Dickinson's kestrel, Falco dickinsoni, found in Eastern to Southern Africa
- Banded kestrel, Falco zoniventris, found on Madagascar

American kestrel

- American kestrel, Falco sparverius, found in North America and South America
