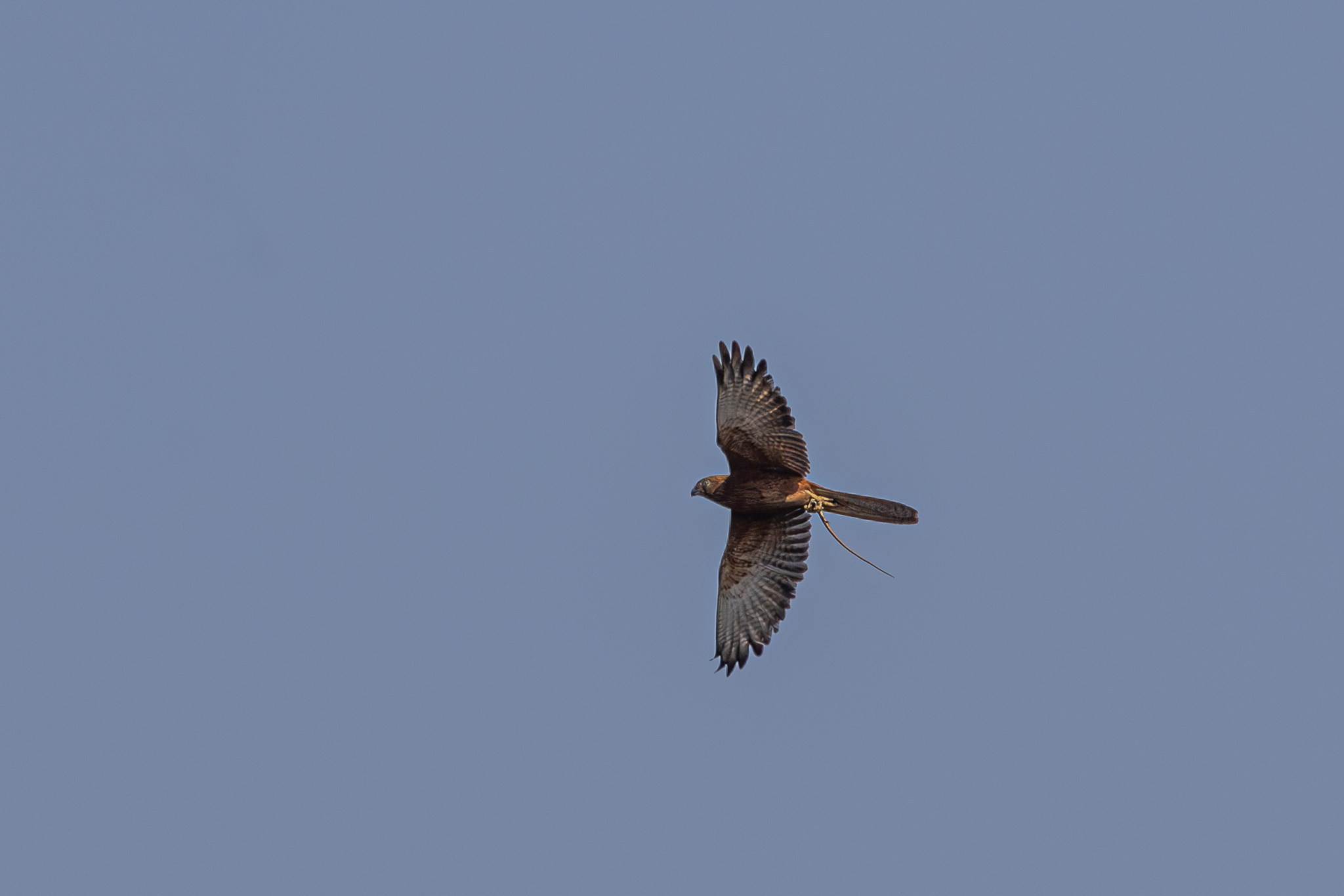

Conservation status
- Least Concern (IUCN 3.1)

Scientific classification
- Kingdom: Animalia
- Phylum: Chordata
- Class: Aves
- Order: Falconiformes
- Family: Falconidae
- Genus: Falco
- Species: F. alopex

Binomial name
- Falco alopex (Heuglin, 1861)

= Fox kestrel =

Species of bird

The fox kestrel (Falco alopex) is a bird of prey belonging to the falcon family Falconidae. It is found in arid, open country in the northern part of Sub-Saharan Africa.

== Description ==
It is a large, slender kestrel with long, narrow wings and tail. It is 32–38 cm (13–15 in) long with a wingspan of 76–88 cm (30–35 in) and a weight of 250–300 g (8.8–10.6 oz). The female is 3% larger than the male. The plumage is dark rufous above and below with black streaks. The tail is narrowly barred with black while the flight feathers of the wing are dark and unbarred. The underwings are pale, contrasting with the darker body. The eye is yellow-brown unlike the similar greater kestrel which has whitish eyes as well as paler plumage, barred flight feathers and grey on the tail.

Juvenile fox kestrels have heavier streaking than the adults and clearer barring on the tail.

The species has a high, screeching call, but is usually silent outside the breeding season.

== Habitat and range ==
It breeds in the savanna region south of the Sahara from Mali eastwards as far as Ethiopia and north-west Kenya. It occasionally wanders west to Senegal, the Gambia and Guinea and south to the Democratic Republic of the Congo. Most birds are sedentary but there is some movement northward during the wet season and southward in the dry season. It is often found around cliffs and rocky hills. It occurs from near sea level to 2200 m, especially below 1000 m. It has a large range of about 4 million km^{2}, but is usually uncommon. Its total population is probably fewer than 100,000 pairs.

== Behaviour ==
It rarely hovers, preferring to hunt from a perch in a tree or on a rock. It feeds on insects, lizards and small mammals. It generally catches food on the ground but also hunts for flying insects escaping from grass fires.

Little is known about its breeding habits. The nest site is a hole or crevice in a cliff or on a ledge. No nesting material is used. The clutch is thought to consist of two or three eggs. The birds sometimes breed in loose colonies of up to 20 pairs.
