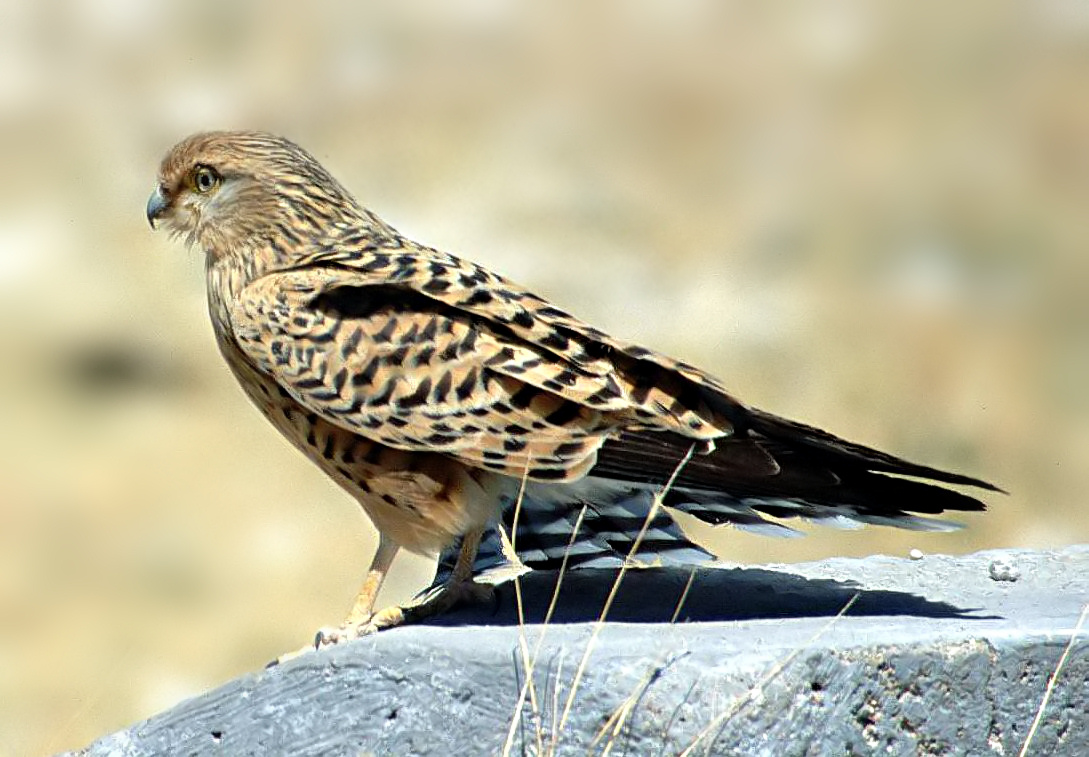

Conservation status
- Least Concern (IUCN 3.1)

Scientific classification
- Kingdom: Animalia
- Phylum: Chordata
- Class: Aves
- Order: Falconiformes
- Family: Falconidae
- Genus: Falco
- Species: F. rupicoloides

Binomial name
- Falco rupicoloides Smith, A, 1829
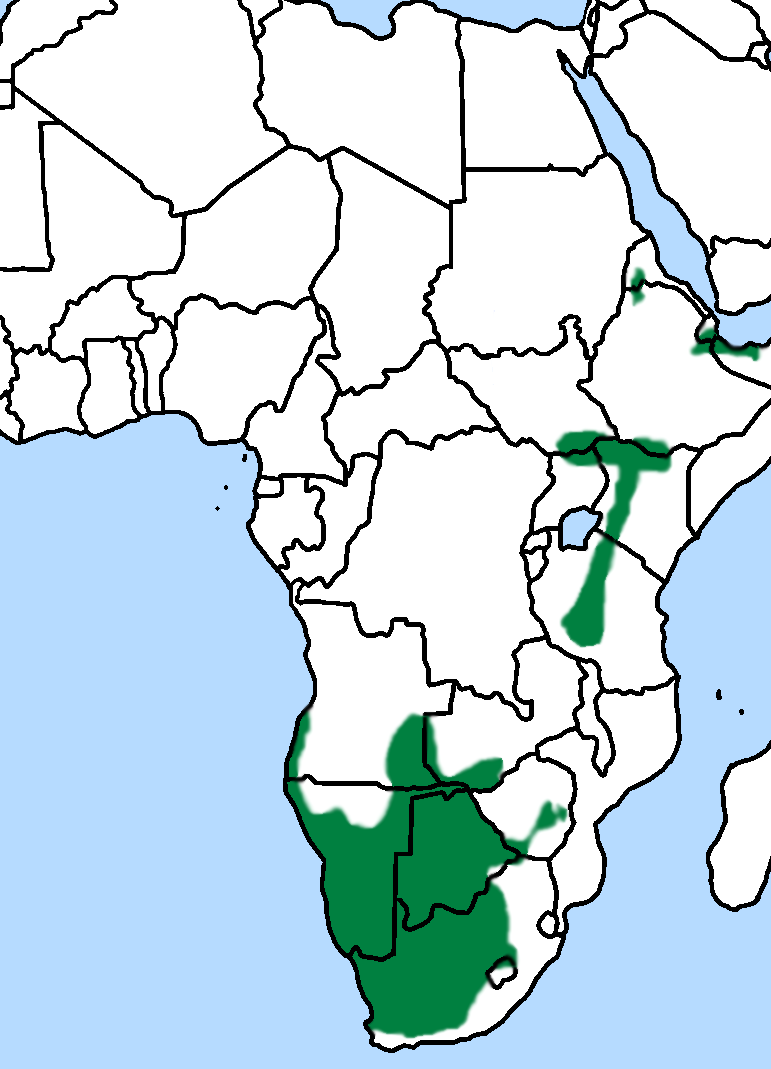

= Greater kestrel =

Species of bird

The greater kestrel (Falco rupicoloides) or white-eyed kestrel is a bird of prey belonging to the falcon family Falconidae. It is one of the largest kestrels and is found in open country in southern and eastern Africa.

== Description ==
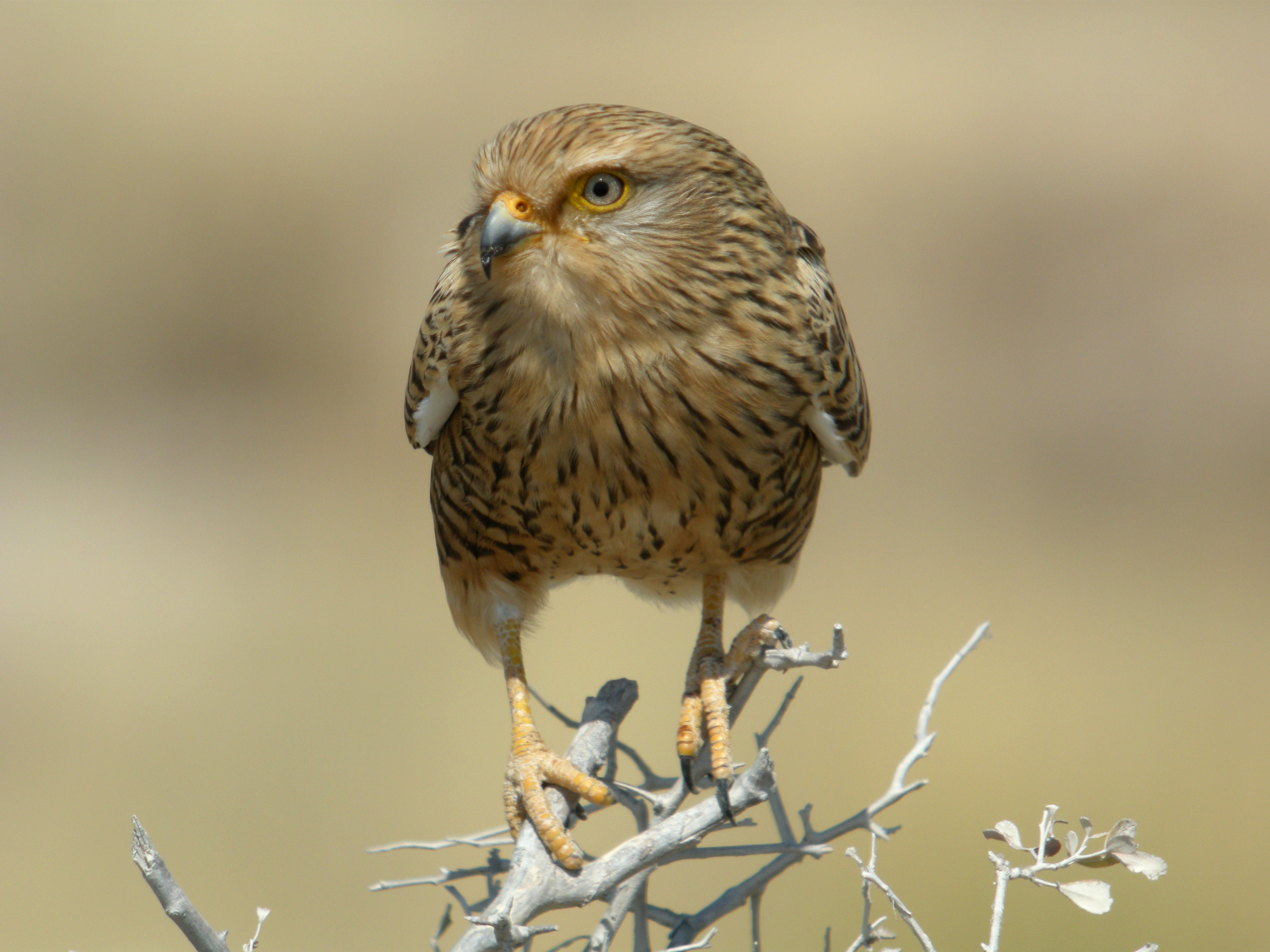
At Etosha National Park, Namibia

The plumage of the adult is mainly pale rufous, both above and below. The back, upperwing and flanks are barred with black. The breast has dark streaks and the head is streaked but has no malar stripe unlike the common and lesser kestrels. The rump and tail are grey with black bars; the tail has a white tip. In flight, the whitish underwing contrasts with the darker body. The iris of the eye is whitish, distinguishing the bird from any similar species. The bill is mainly blue-grey and the feet and cere are yellow. Juvenile birds have rufous instead of grey on the tail, streaked flanks and a dark eye.

The bird is 29–37 cm (11–15 in) long with a wingspan of 68–84 cm (27–33 in) The southern subspecies F. r. rupicoloides weighs about 181–334gr (.400–.736 lb). The form F. r. arthuri is smaller, weighing about 165–252gr (.364–.556 lb). The northern subspecies F. r. fieldi is also small and is paler than the others.

The species is usually silent but has a shrill, repeated call.

== Habitat and range ==
It occurs in open, arid areas where it inhabits grassland, savannas and semi-desert. It is often associated with acacias. It prefers areas where the ground cover is lower than 50 cm. It is found from sea-level up to 2150 metres, particularly between 800 and 1800 metres.

It is fairly common and widespread in the southern parts of its range but is scarce and patchily distributed further north. The form F. r. rupicoloides breeds in Namibia, Botswana, Zimbabwe, parts of Angola and Zambia and in much of South Africa apart from the wetter regions of the south and east. F. r. arthuri is found in Kenya and northern Tanzania while F. r. fieldi occurs in Ethiopia, Eritrea, northern Somalia and probably northern Kenya.

The total range covers about 3.5 million km^{2}. The population is stable and is likely to be in the order of 100,000 to 200,000 pairs. Most birds are sedentary but some are nomadic or dispersive.

== Feeding ==
The greater kestrel usually hunts from an exposed perch such as a tree or rock. It also hovers like several other kestrels. It feeds mainly on invertebrates such as grasshoppers, termites, beetles and solifugids. It also takes lizards and sometimes small birds, mammals and snakes. It mainly catches prey on the ground. It is attracted to fires where it catches insects and other prey as they flee from the flames. Excess food may be cached underneath vegetation or stones.

== Reproduction ==
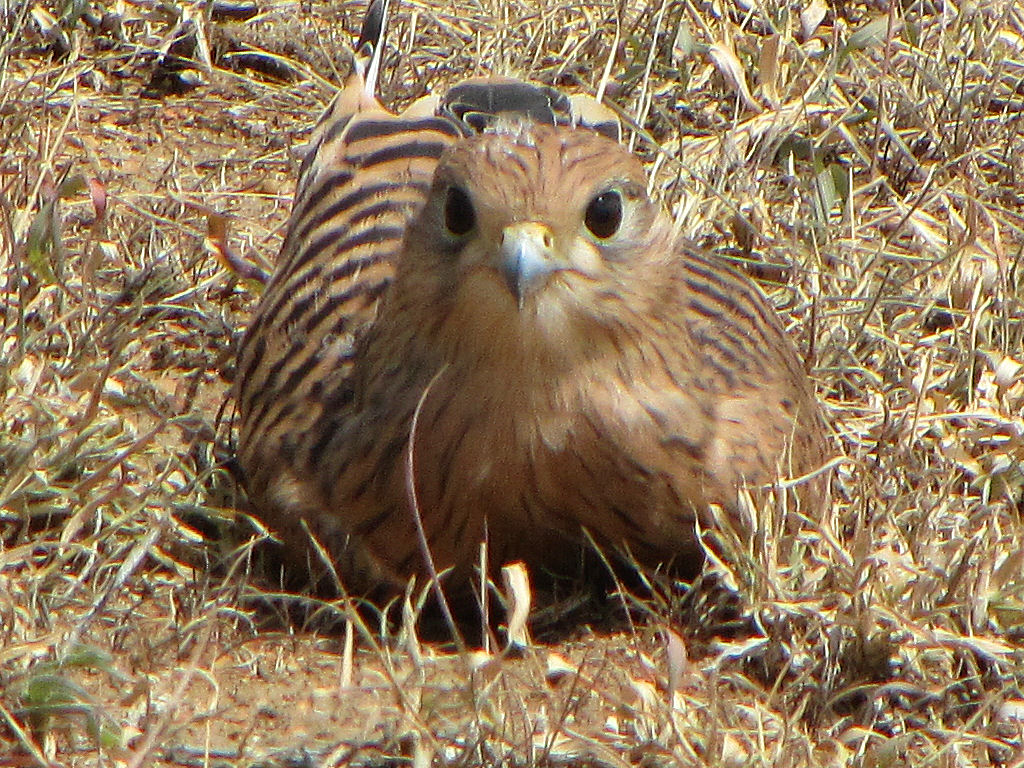
Juvenile, Serengeti National Park, Tanzania

The breeding season varies between different regions. In the south it lasts from July to April with a peak between September and December. Breeding takes place in all months in Kenya and Tanzania but is concentrated between April and July. The season lasts from April to August in Somalia.

Greater kestrels use the old nest of another bird for breeding, such as that of a Cape crow or pied crow. A typical site is between 2 and 20 metres above the ground in a tree or sometimes on a telegraph pole or pylon. Two to seven eggs are laid with three or four being most common. They are incubated for 22 to 23 days, mainly by the female. The young birds fledge after 30 to 34 days and remain dependent on their parents for at least 26 days longer.
