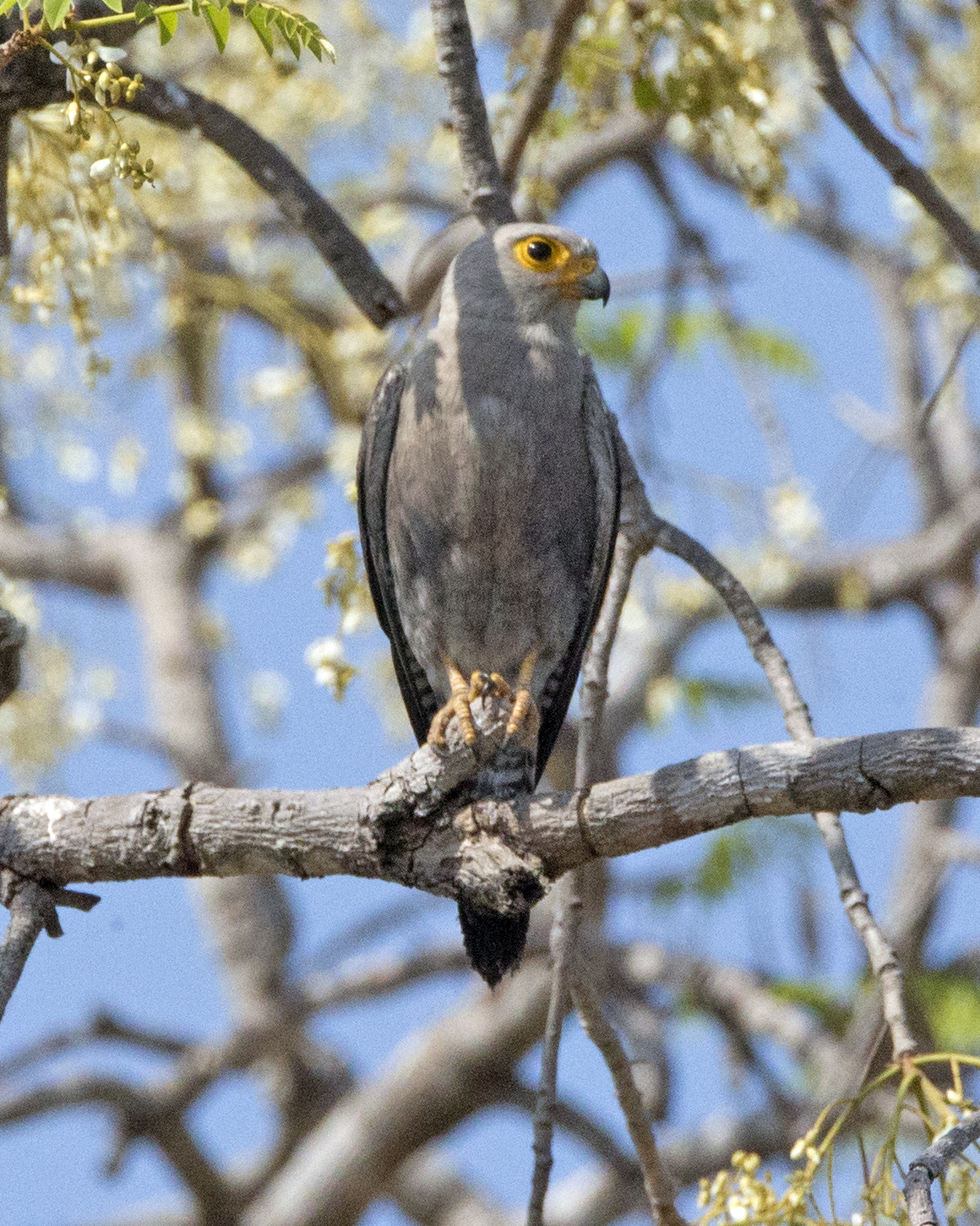
- in Liwonde, Malawi

Conservation status
- Least Concern (IUCN 3.1)

Scientific classification
- Kingdom: Animalia
- Phylum: Chordata
- Class: Aves
- Order: Falconiformes
- Family: Falconidae
- Genus: Falco
- Species: F. dickinsoni

Binomial name
- Falco dickinsoni Sclater, PL, 1864

= Dickinson's kestrel =

Species of bird

Dickinson's kestrel (Falco dickinsoni) is a bird of prey of southern and eastern Africa belonging to the falcon family Falconidae. It is named after John Dickinson, an English physician and missionary who collected the type specimen. It is also known as the white-rumped kestrel. Its closest relatives are the grey kestrel and banded kestrel and the three are sometimes placed in the subgenus Dissodectes.

== Description ==
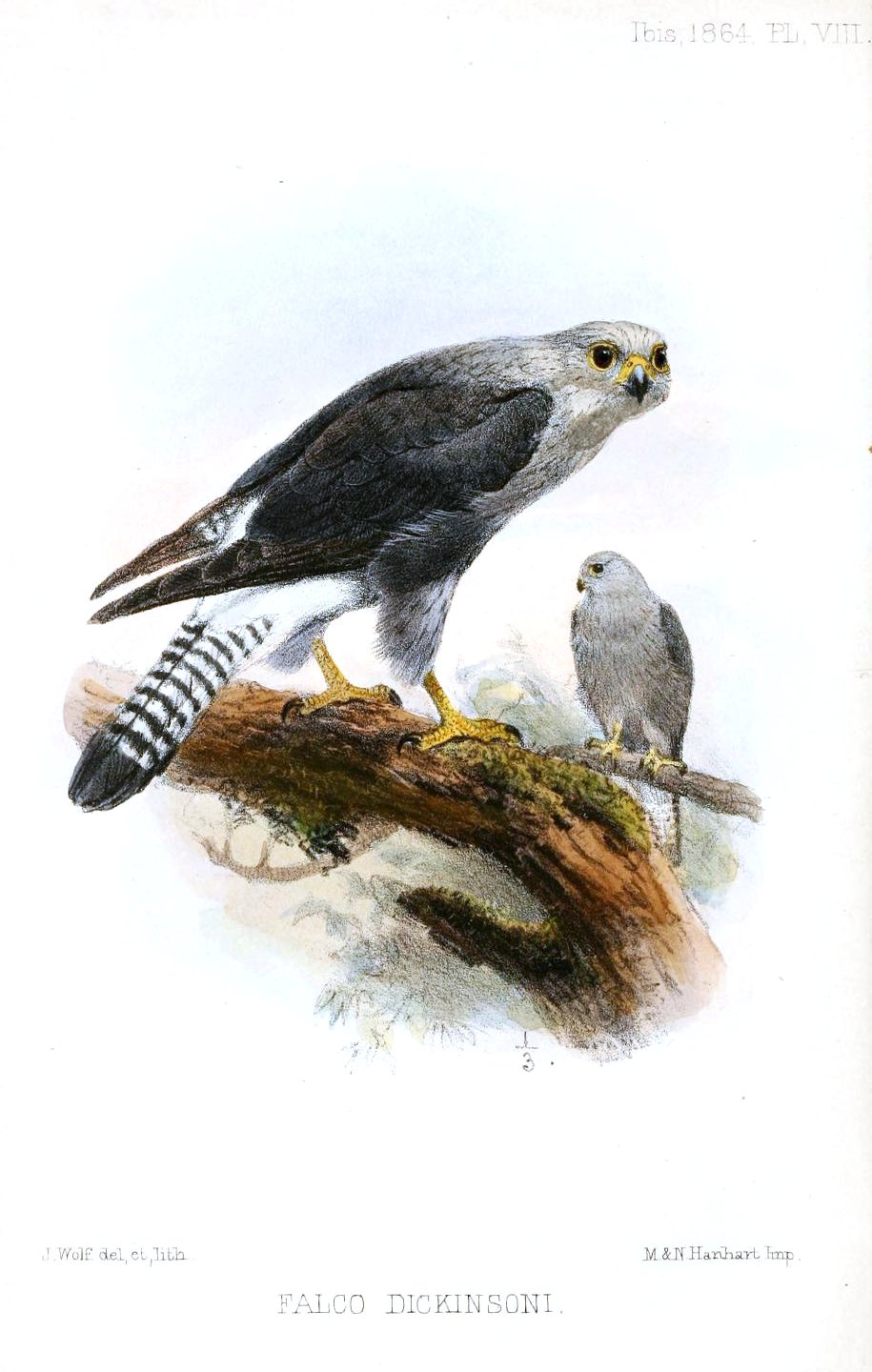
Illustration by Joseph Wolf

It is a fairly small, stocky kestrel with a large, square head. It is 27–30 cm (11–12 in) long with a wingspan of 61–68 cm (24–27 in) and a weight of 167–246 g (5.9–8.7 oz). The female is about 4% larger and 10-20% heavier than the male. The plumage is mostly dark grey with a pale head and rump. The tail is grey with narrow black bars and a broad subterminal band. The underside of the flight feathers are also barred. The cere and feet are yellow and there is bare yellow skin around the eye. The bill is dark grey and the eyes are brown. Juvenile birds are grey-brown with barred flanks and without the paler head and rump. They have a greenish cere and eye-ring.

It is usually silent but has a high-pitched alarm and contact call. At the nest, a soft, mewing call attracts the young for feeding.

== Distribution and habitat ==
It inhabits savanna and open woodland, particularly swampy areas near water. It favours miombo woodland and is typically associated with palm trees (such as Hyphaene and Borassus species) and is also often found near baobab trees. It occurs in coconut plantations in some areas.

Its range covers most of Mozambique, Zimbabwe, Zambia and Malawi along with north-eastern South Africa (mainly in Kruger National Park), northern Botswana, north-east Namibia, eastern Angola, southern Democratic Republic of the Congo and parts of Tanzania. It is an occasional visitor to Kenya. The total range is about 3,400,000 km^{2} (1,300,000 sq mi). It is generally rather scarce but is commoner in some areas such as Zanzibar and Pemba Islands. Loss of palm trees is a potential threat to the species.

== Behaviour ==
It usually hunts from a perch and only occasionally hovers. Large insects such as grasshoppers form the bulk of the diet. It also feeds on lizards and amphibians and sometimes birds, bats, rodents and snakes. It is often attracted to grass fires where it preys on fleeing insects and other prey.

The breeding season lasts from July to October in Tanzania and September to December further south. The nest is a simple scrape with no material used. It is sited 2 to 18 m (6.6 to 59.1 ft) above the ground in the crown of a dead palm or in a hole in a baobab. Sometimes the old nest of a Hamerkop is used. One to four eggs are laid. They are cream-coloured with reddish-brown markings and are incubated by the female for at least 30 days. The young birds fledge after approximately 33 to 35 days.
