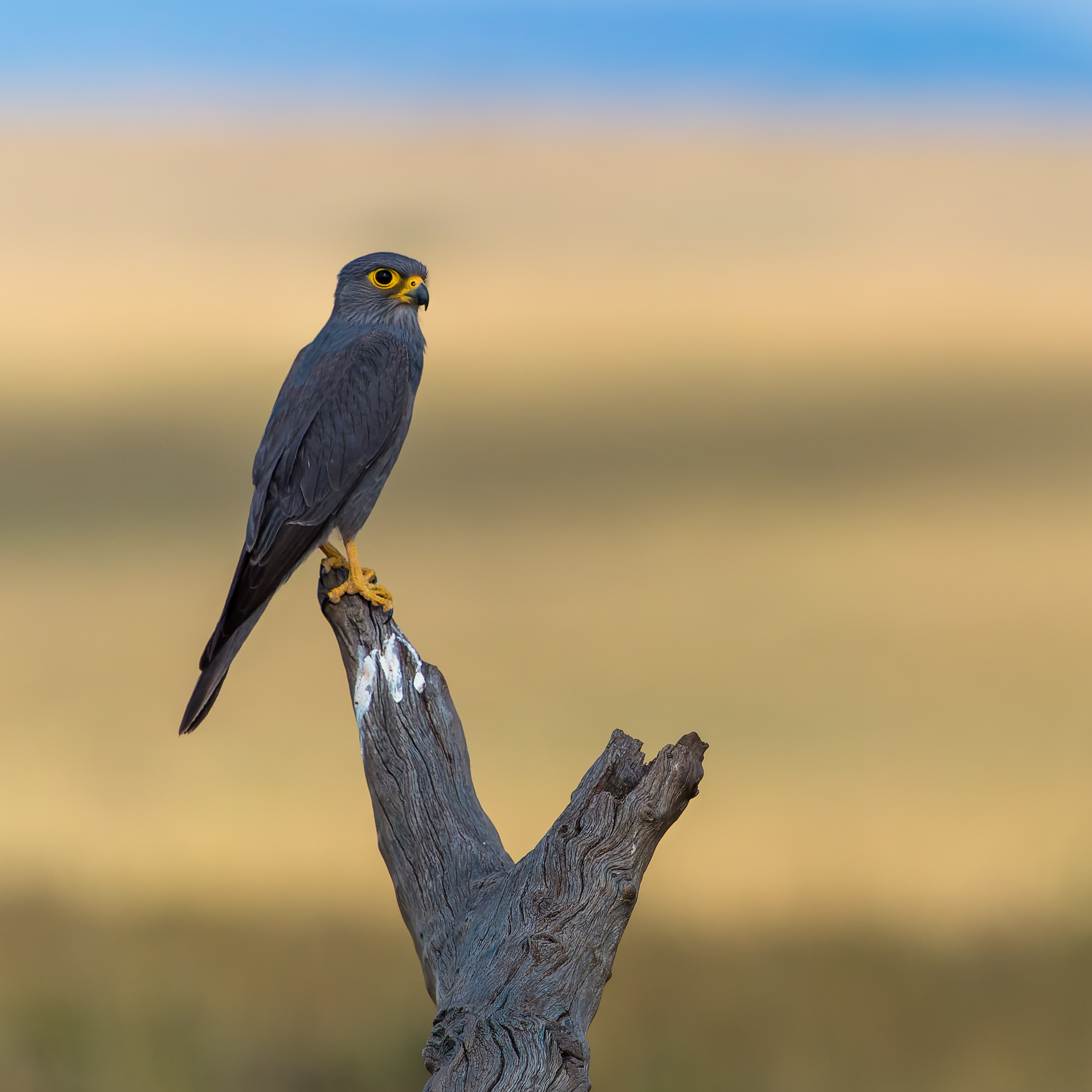
- Grey kestrel at the Maasai Mara, Kenya

Conservation status
- Least Concern (IUCN 3.1)

Scientific classification
- Kingdom: Animalia
- Phylum: Chordata
- Class: Aves
- Order: Falconiformes
- Family: Falconidae
- Genus: Falco
- Species: F. ardosiaceus

Binomial name
- Falco ardosiaceus Vieillot, 1823

= Grey kestrel =

Species of bird

The grey kestrel (Falco ardosiaceus) is an African bird of prey belonging to the falcon family Falconidae. Its closest relatives are the banded kestrel and Dickinson's kestrel and the three are sometimes placed in the subgenus Dissodectes.

== Description ==
It is a fairly small, stocky kestrel with a large, flat-topped head and fairly short wings that don't reach past the tip of the tail when at rest. It is 28–33 cm long with a wingspan of 58–72 cm and a weight of up to 300 grams. The female is 4-11% larger and 5-11% heavier than the male. The plumage of the adult is uniformly dark grey apart from darker wingtips, faint dark streaking on the body and slightly barred flight feathers. The feet and cere are yellow and there is bare yellow skin around the eye. The most similar species is the sooty falcon which has a more rounded head, long wings extending past the tail and less yellow around the eye.

Juvenile grey kestrels are browner than the adults with a greenish cere and greenish around the eye. Juvenile Dickinson's kestrels are similar but have a barred tail and a more strongly barred underwing.

The grey kestrel is generally silent outside the breeding season but has a shrill, chattering call and a rattling whistle.

== Habitat and range ==
It inhabits savannas, open woodland and forest clearings. It favours areas with palm trees, especially near water. It often perches on exposed branches, telegraph poles and wires.

It is widespread in West and Central Africa but is absent from densely forested regions including parts of the Congo Basin. Its range extends east to Ethiopia and western parts of Kenya and Tanzania. In the south it reaches northern parts of Namibia and Zambia and vagrants have appeared in Malawi. The total range covers about 12 million km^{2}. In West Africa there is some movement northward in the wet season and southward in the dry season.

== Behaviour ==
It is a crepuscular bird, most active at dawn and dusk. It generally hunts from a high perch but occasionally hovers. It feeds mainly on insects, lizards and small mammals such as bats but will also take birds, amphibians and worms. Prey is usually caught on the ground. It will sometimes feed on oil palm nuts, one of the few birds of prey to eat vegetable matter.

Breeding occurs from March to June in the north of its range and from August to December in the south. Courting pairs perform mutual soaring displays. The eggs are usually laid in the nest of a hamerkop; most often an unoccupied nest but occasionally hamerkops will be forced out. Sometimes the kestrels will use the nest of another bird or a hole in a tree. There are two to five eggs in a clutch. They are whitish with reddish or brown markings and are incubated for 26–31 days. The young birds fledge after about 30 days.
