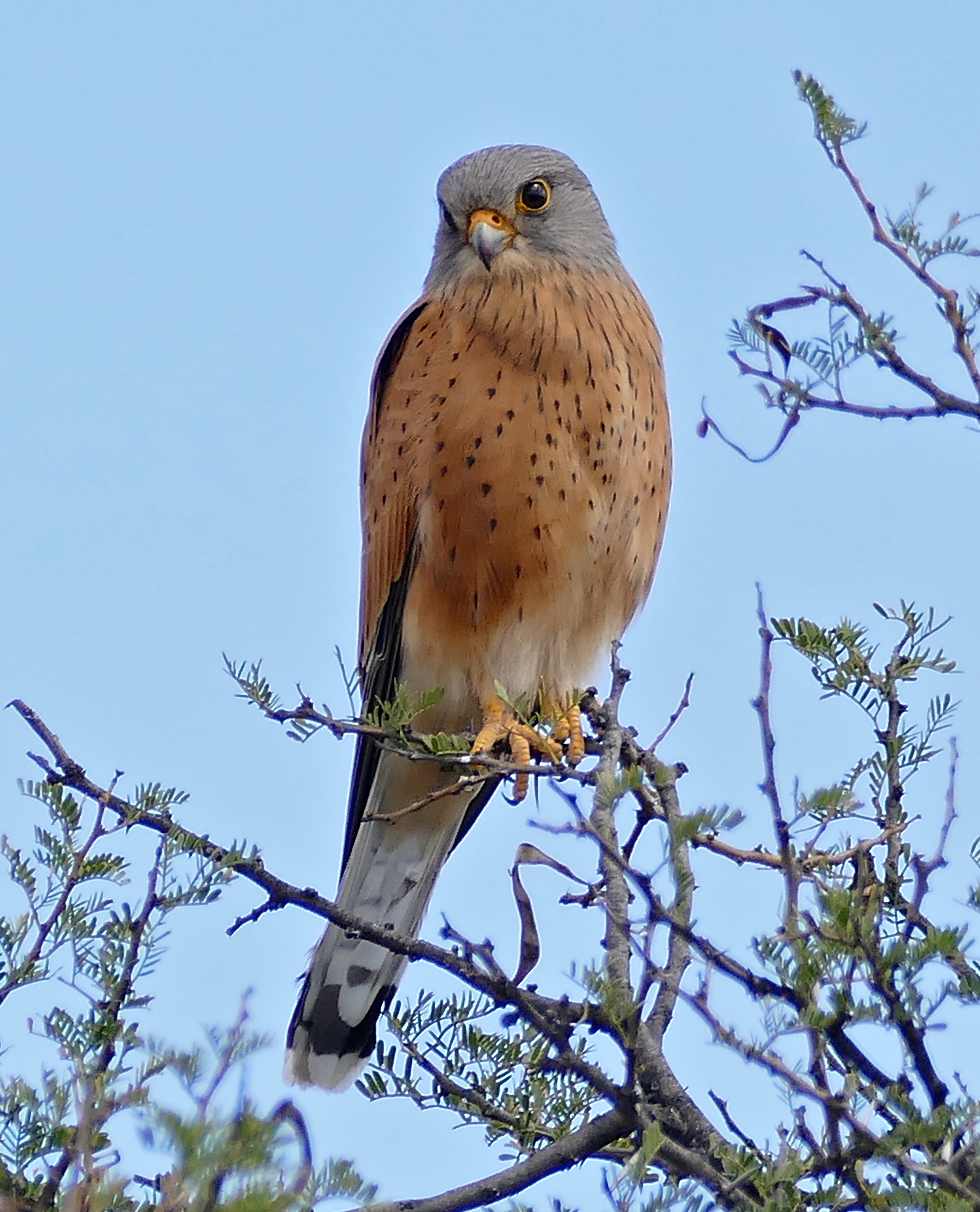

Scientific classification
- Kingdom: Animalia
- Phylum: Chordata
- Class: Aves
- Order: Falconiformes
- Family: Falconidae
- Genus: Falco
- Species: F. rupicolus

Binomial name
- Falco rupicolus Daudin, 1800

Synonyms
- Falco tinnunculus rupicolus Daudin, 1800; Falco tinnunculus interstictus (lapsus)

= Rock kestrel =

Species of bird

The rock kestrel (Falco rupicolus) is a bird of prey species belonging to the kestrel group of the falcon family Falconidae. It was previously considered a subspecies of the common kestrel (Falco tinnunculus).

This species occurs in Africa, from northwestern Angola and southern Democratic Republic of Congo to southern Tanzania, and south to South Africa.

== Description ==
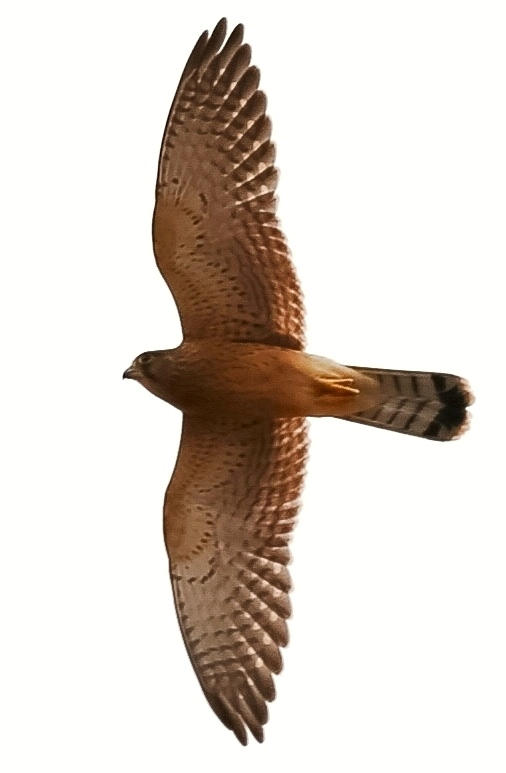
In flight, southern Namibia

A slender, medium-sized kestrel, between 30 and 33 centimeters tall. Adult male kestrels weigh between 183g and 254g, while females weigh between 190g and 280g.

== Distribution and habitat ==
The species occurs from Angola, south through the Democratic Republic of Congo as well as Tanzania, further south to South Africa, and in most of the places between. Noticeable places of scarcity include north and north east Namibia, Botswana, south Mozambique and tropical Lowveld, while in Zimbabwe it is restricted to high-lying central and eastern regions. The kestrel is usually associated with arid areas, but may also be found in open and/or semi-arid areas.

== Behavior ==
=== Diet, feeding and call ===
Rock kestrels feed on a wide variety of organisms. They eat primarily invertebrates, but have been known to consume rodents, reptiles and birds.

Two primary forms of hunting are employed: hover hunting and perch hunting. Hover hunting describes the method whereby the kestrel remains stationary in the air with minimal wing flapping by utilizing updrafts. Hover hunting generally happens at medium to high windspeeds. It is usually small prey (such as insects) which are caught via this method, and are subsequently eaten during flight. Perch hunting is when the kestrel utilizes either natural (for instance cliffs and trees) or artificial (for instance electricity pylons and telephone poles) perches to scan the surrounding area for prey. Rock kestrels have been observed following baboons through grasslands and catching the insect species flushed out. There are also reports of rock kestrels robbing nests for young birds and eating termites on the floor.

Their call is a harsh chay-chay-chay, especially when scaring off intruders, unlike the common kestrel's kee-kee-kee.

=== Breeding ===
Rock kestrels usually nest in either old stick nests or on cliffs, where they may make a depression in the sand. They have also been observed utilizing buildings, but this appears to be unusual. Clutch sizes vary between 1 and 6 eggs. The female incubates the eggs full-time while the male sources food. After 26 to 32 days the chicks hatch. Chicks will remain in the nest for a further 31 to 39 days post hatching. Thereafter they leave the nest, but often remain in the vicinity for several weeks. Breeding density varies across habitats however a study in Namibia noted values of between 19.1 and 28.9 pairs per 100 square kilometers.

== Status and conservation ==
The rock kestrel is common in many protected areas, and as a result is not threatened.
