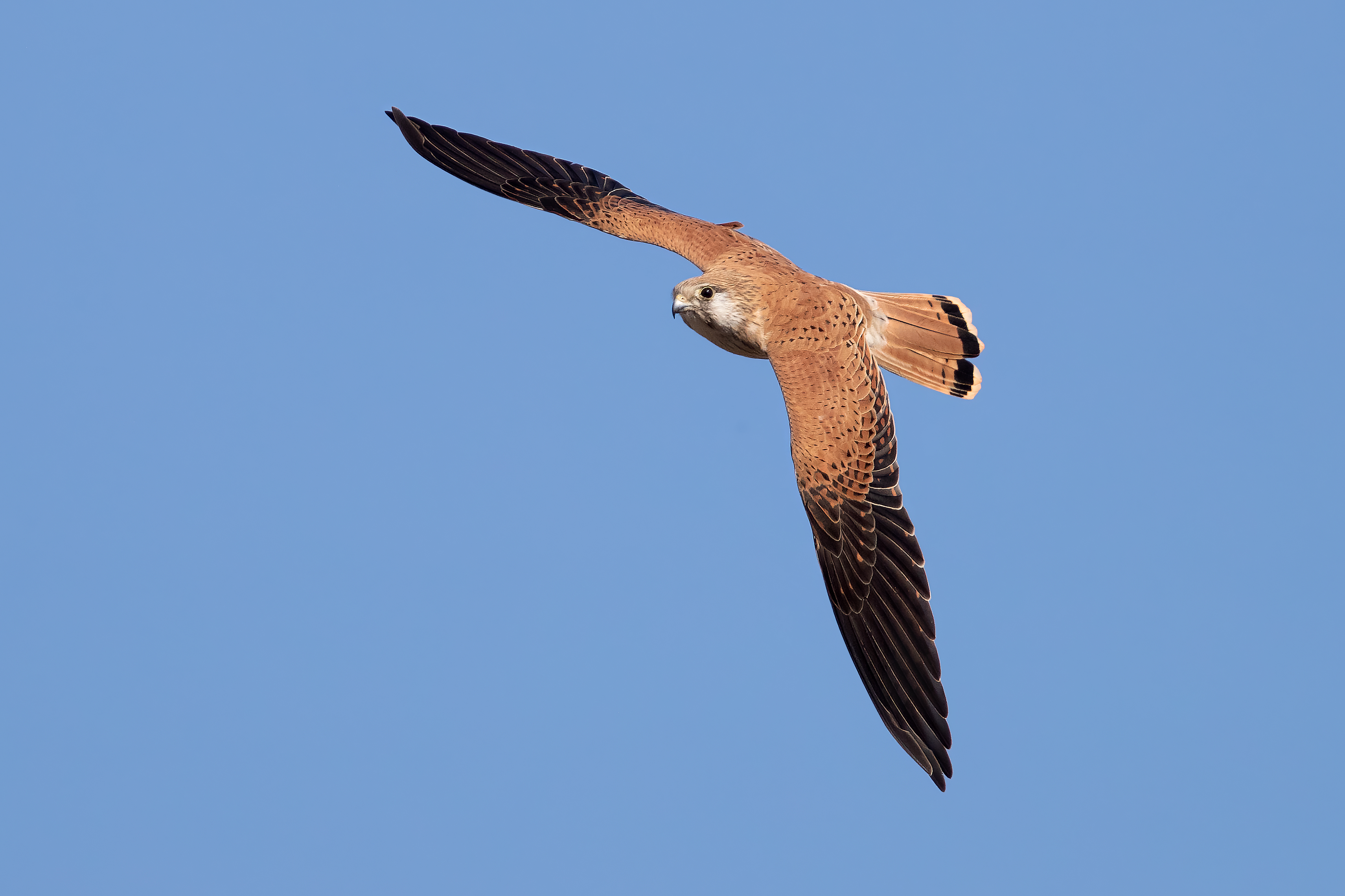
- In flight
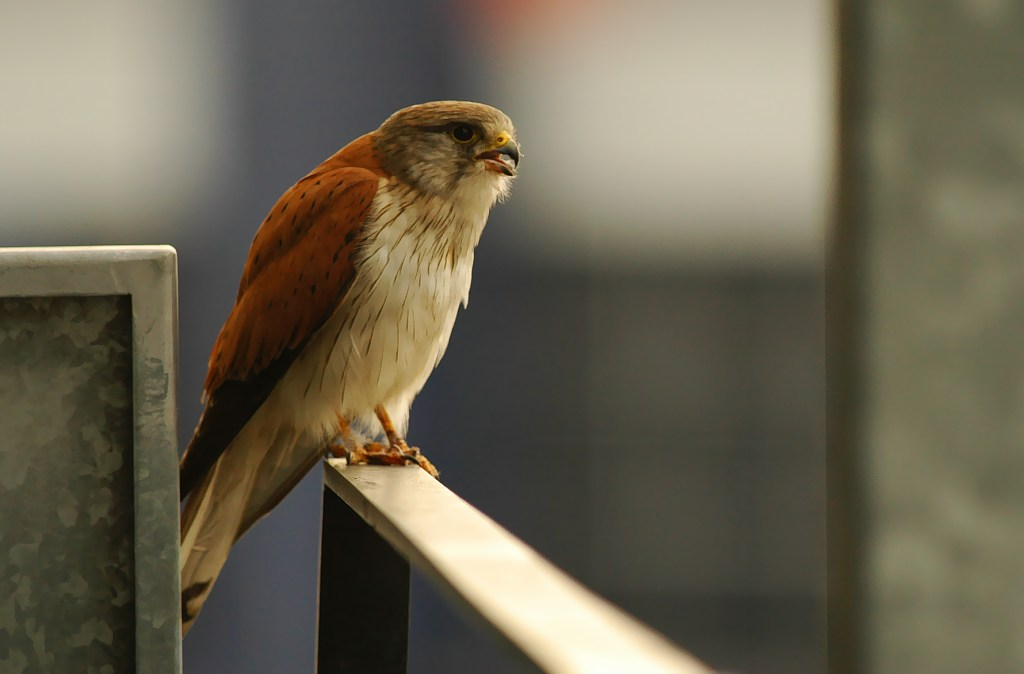
- Female

Conservation status
- Least Concern (IUCN 3.1)

Scientific classification
- Kingdom: Animalia
- Phylum: Chordata
- Class: Aves
- Order: Falconiformes
- Family: Falconidae
- Genus: Falco
- Species: F. cenchroides

Binomial name
- Falco cenchroides Vigors & Horsfield, 1827

= Nankeen kestrel =

Species of bird

The nankeen kestrel (Falco cenchroides), also known as the Australian kestrel, is a raptor native to Australia and New Guinea. It is one of the smallest falcons, and unlike many, does not rely on speed to catch its prey. Instead, it simply perches in an exposed position, but it also has a distinctive technique of hovering over crop and grasslands.

== Taxonomy ==
The nankeen kestrel is a species of the genus Falco, allied to a subgenus Tinnunculus. They were first described by Nicholas Vigors, James Gleeson and Thomas Horsfield in 1827. Further descriptions — regarded as synonyms for the species — were published: Cerchneis immaculata Brehm, 1845; the later name Cerchneis unicolor by Alexander Milligan was published in Emu in 1904; and that author's name appearing in the assignment to a subspecies, Cerchneis cenchroides milligani, published by Gregory Mathews in 1912.

The generic name is Late Latin falco 'falcon' (from falx falcis, 'sickle') and the specific epithet is derived from Ancient Greek kenkhris 'kestrel' and -oides 'resembling'.

The common names mosquito hawk, kestrel, windhover, hoverer are cited in the Australian Faunal Directory. Its common descriptor refers to the colour of nankeen cloth, originally a yellowish cotton from Nankeen or Nanking (modern Nanjing), China.

This bird is thought to be a very close relative of the Eurasian kestrel (Falco tinnunculus), and probably also the spotted kestrel (Falco moluccensis). It seems to have evolved from ancestral common kestrels dispersing to the Australian region in the Middle Pleistocene — less than 1 million years ago — and adapting to local conditions.

Two subspecies are recognised: the nominate subspecies Falco cenchroides cenchroides is found throughout Australia and Tasmania, as well as Christmas Island, Norfolk Island, Lord Howe Island, and as a non-breeding visitor to southern New Guinea; and F. c. baru Rand, 1940 is found in the Snow Mountains of west central New Guinea.

== Description ==
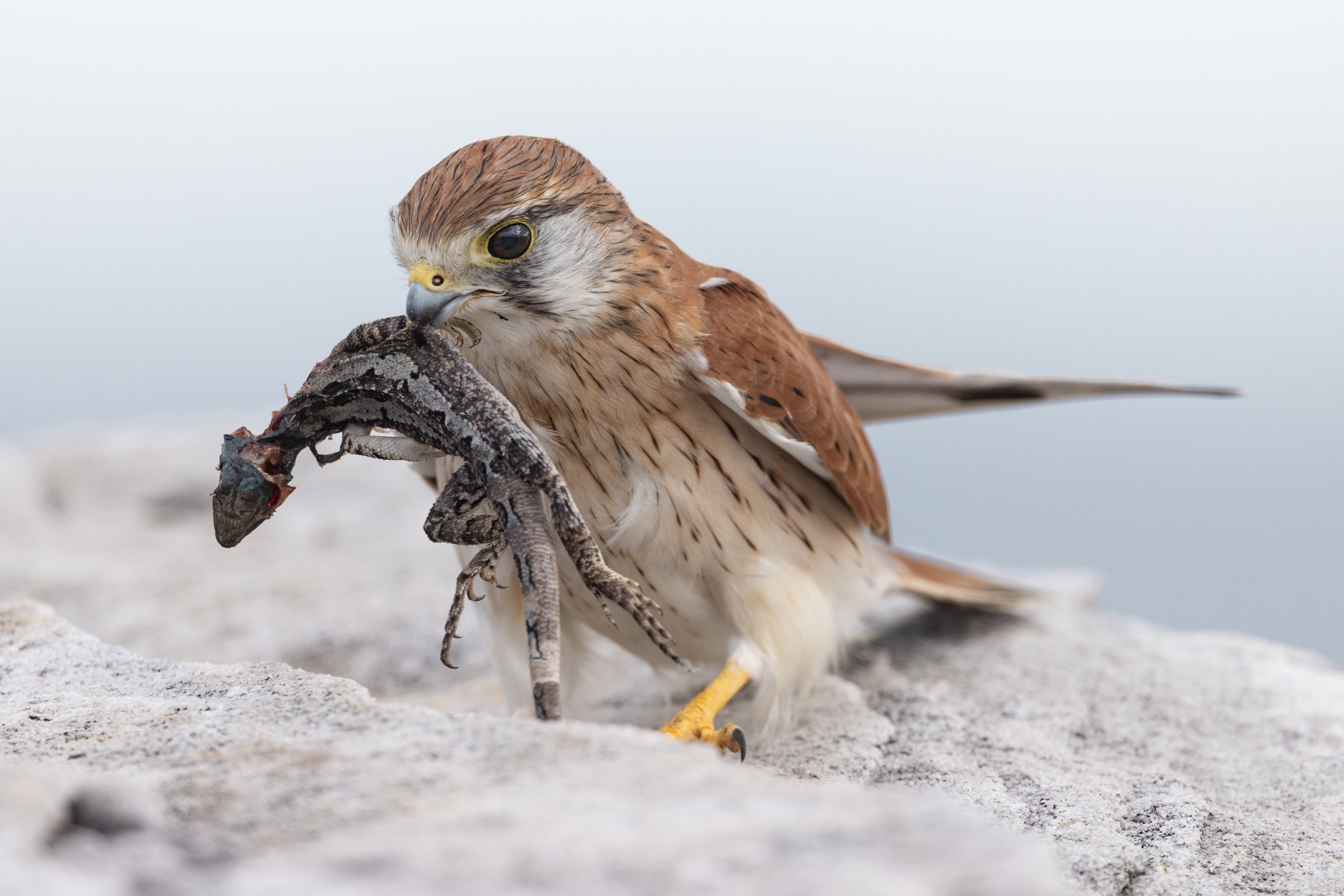
With kill in beak, Botany Bay, Sydney

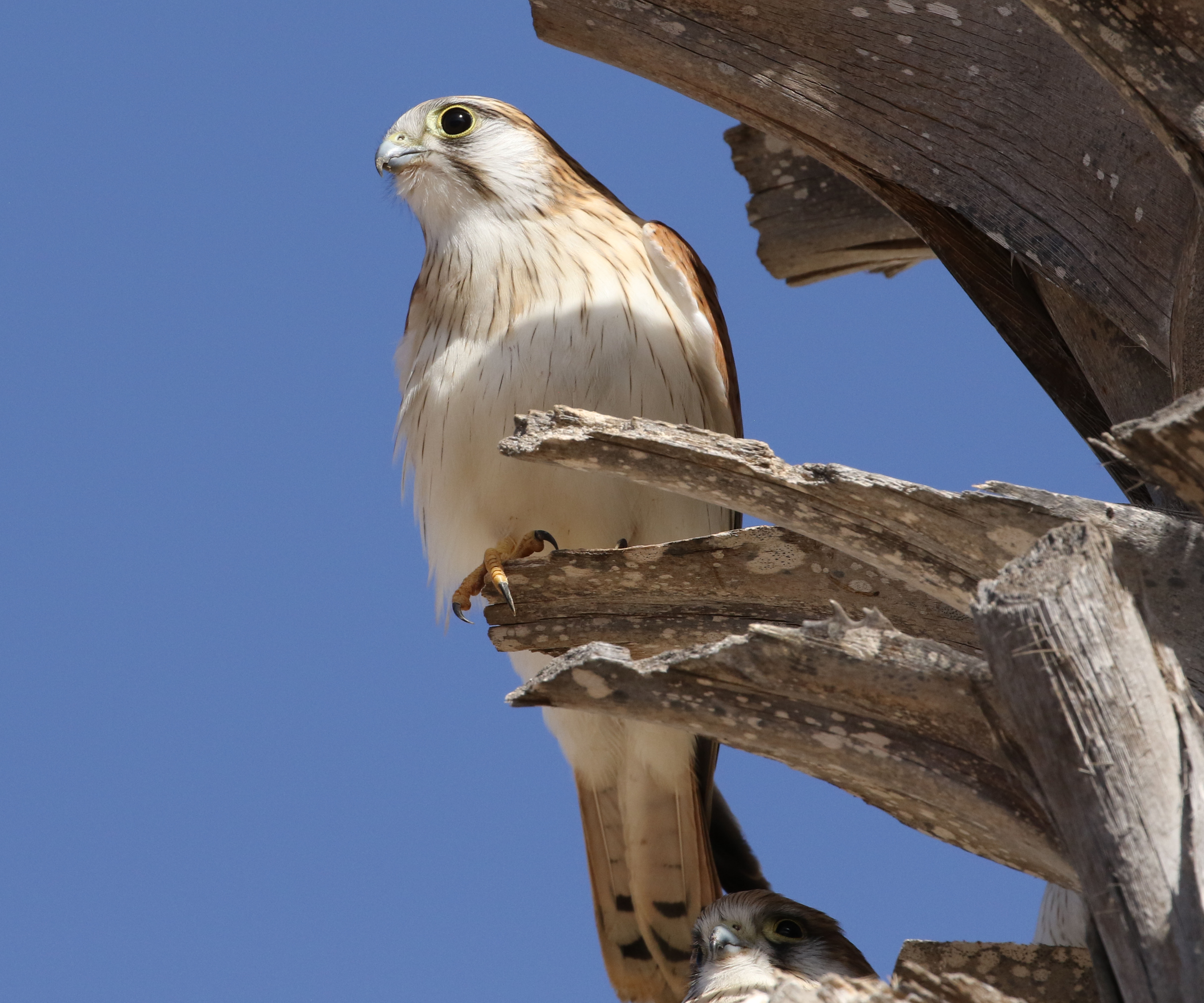
Juvenile nankeen kestrel, Carnarvon, Western Australia

The nankeen kestrel is a small, slim falcon 28 to 35 cm (11 to 14 in) long with a wingspan of 66 to 78 cm (26 to 31 in). The male weighs 121 to 195 g (4.3 to 6.9 oz) while the female weighs 115 to 273 g (4.1 to 9.6 oz). It has pale rufous upper-parts with contrasting black flight-feathers and is finely streaked white below, with a black subterminal band. The cere, eye-ring, and legs are yellow. The male has a pale grey crown and tail with a darker grey tear-mark, while the female and juvenile have a pale rufous crown and finely barred rufous tail. Plumage varies considerably in detail, and some birds can look very scruffy, but the slim build, small size and distinctive straight-winged hovering habit make identification easy. The only other Australasian raptors to hover are the elanid kites, which are much lighter in colour and a little larger, and the brown falcon, which is much larger and more heavily built, and hovers only occasionally. Altogether, the nankeen kestrel looks just like a pale, less patterned, and smaller derivate of the Eurasian kestrel, which it indeed is (see Gloger's Rule, Bergmann's Rule).

== Distribution and habitat ==
A very common and easily seen raptor, the nankeen kestrel is found in Australia, New Guinea, and nearby islands, and is an irregular visitor to New Zealand. It occupies any type of land that is not too densely vegetated, but in particular temperate grasslands and open woodlands. In the tropical north and the sandy deserts of the west, it has a patchy and seasonal distribution. It can be seen in Western Australia on coastal cliffs and windy conditions. Also seen on phone lines and power lines.

Like many Australian birds, it has no clear migratory pattern: in the grasslands of the south, established pairs are resident year-round, but many other birds migrate north during the austral winter, or roam the arid interior following food supplies. Typically seen singly or in pairs, they can aggregate into loose flocks of up to 30 when conditions are right. Pairs are typically monogamous and may or may not disperse to different areas during the non-breeding season. The nest is any convenient structure: a tree hollow, cliff ledge or disused corvid's nest, for example, and is not modified or added to by the kestrels.

== Feeding ==
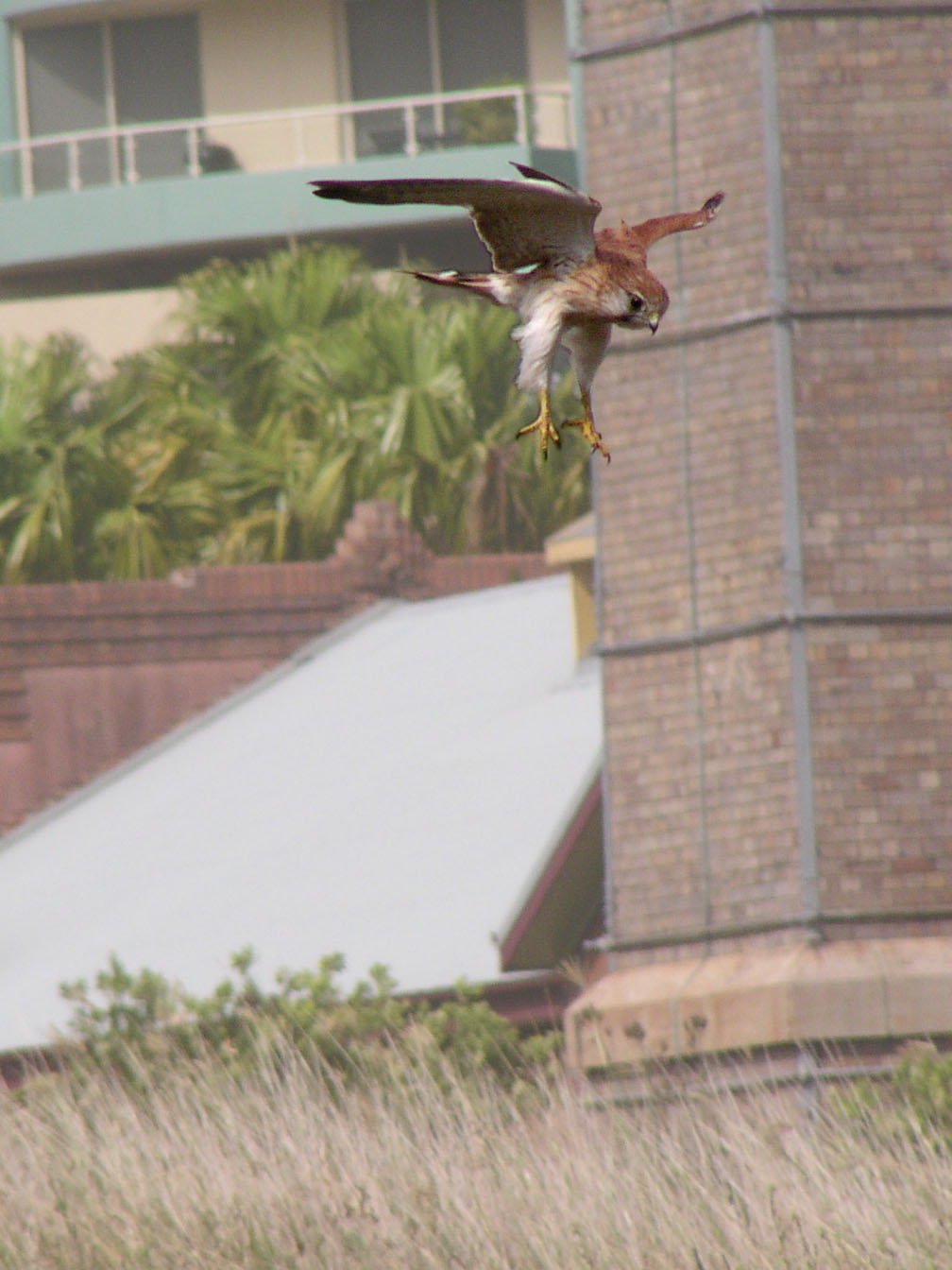
About to pounce

Diet is varied, with a large number of insects (such as grasshoppers, crickets, beetles, moths, and also ants) and other arthropods (such as centipedes and spiders), but also small birds (especially common starlings and sparrows where feral and numerous) and reptiles (such as small lizards, mainly skinks), and in particular, small rodents, mostly mice. Carrion is apparently occasionally taken. Nankeen kestrels are adaptable and hunt in a number of different ways: of these, simply perching in an exposed position (such as on a dead tree or a telephone pole) and watching for prey is the most common, but it is their habit of hovering motionless over crop and grasslands that is most distinctive.

== Breeding ==
Three to seven eggs are laid in late winter (usually about four) and incubated by the female alone. Hatching takes place after 26 to 28 days, and the male brings food while the female continues to incubate until the young are close to fledging, at which time the female leaves the nest to hunt for them too. Multiple broods are raised in good seasons.
