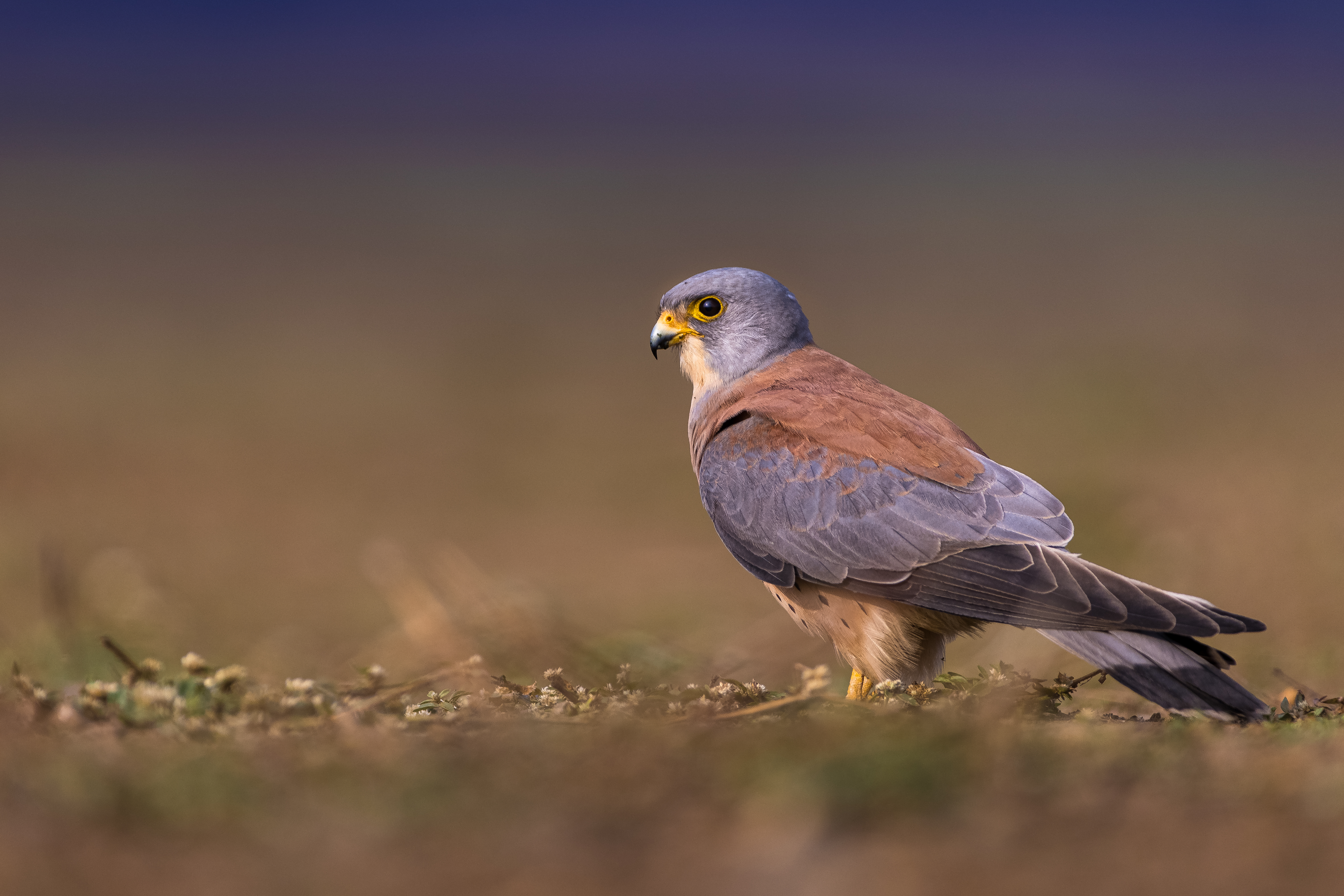
- Male
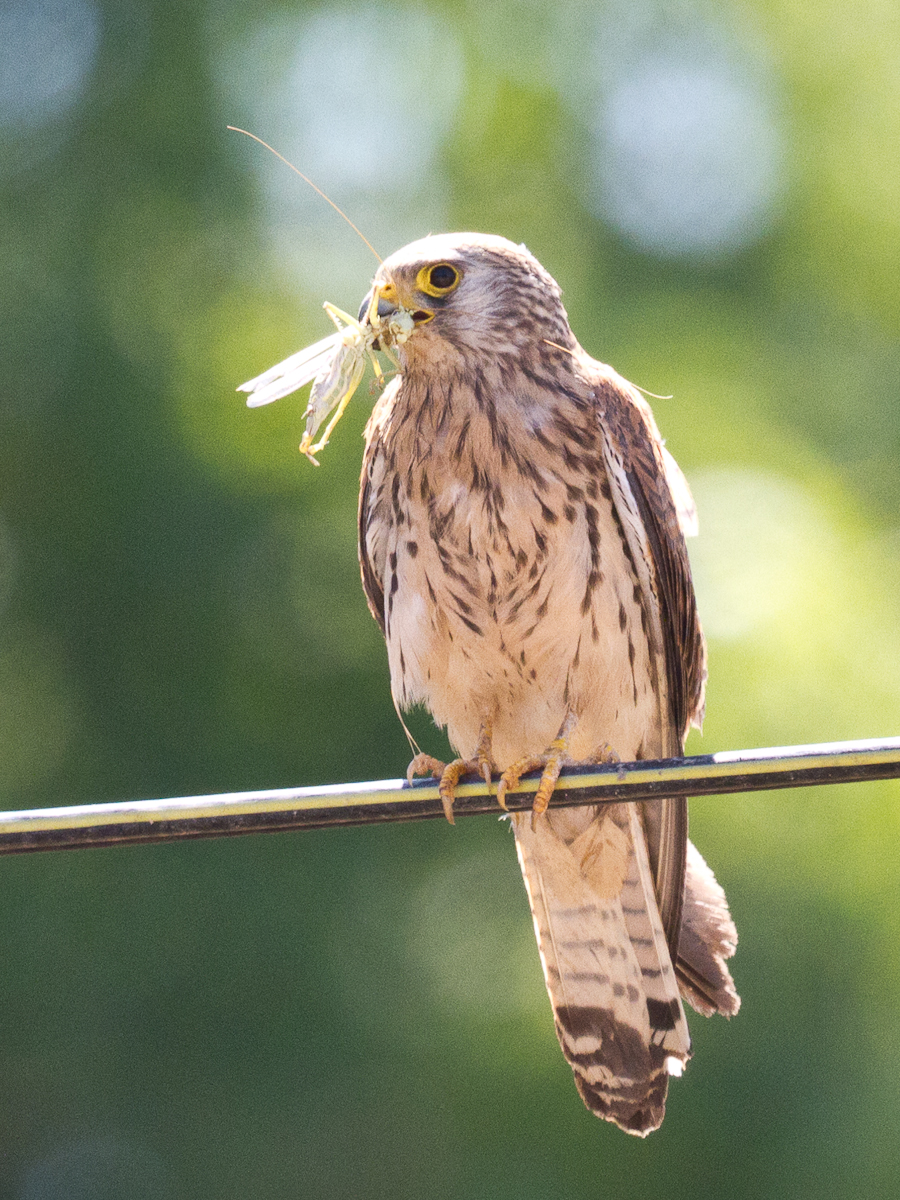
- Female

Conservation status
- Least Concern (IUCN 3.1)

Scientific classification
- Kingdom: Animalia
- Phylum: Chordata
- Class: Aves
- Order: Falconiformes
- Family: Falconidae
- Genus: Falco
- Species: F. naumanni

Binomial name
- Falco naumanni Fleischer, 1818
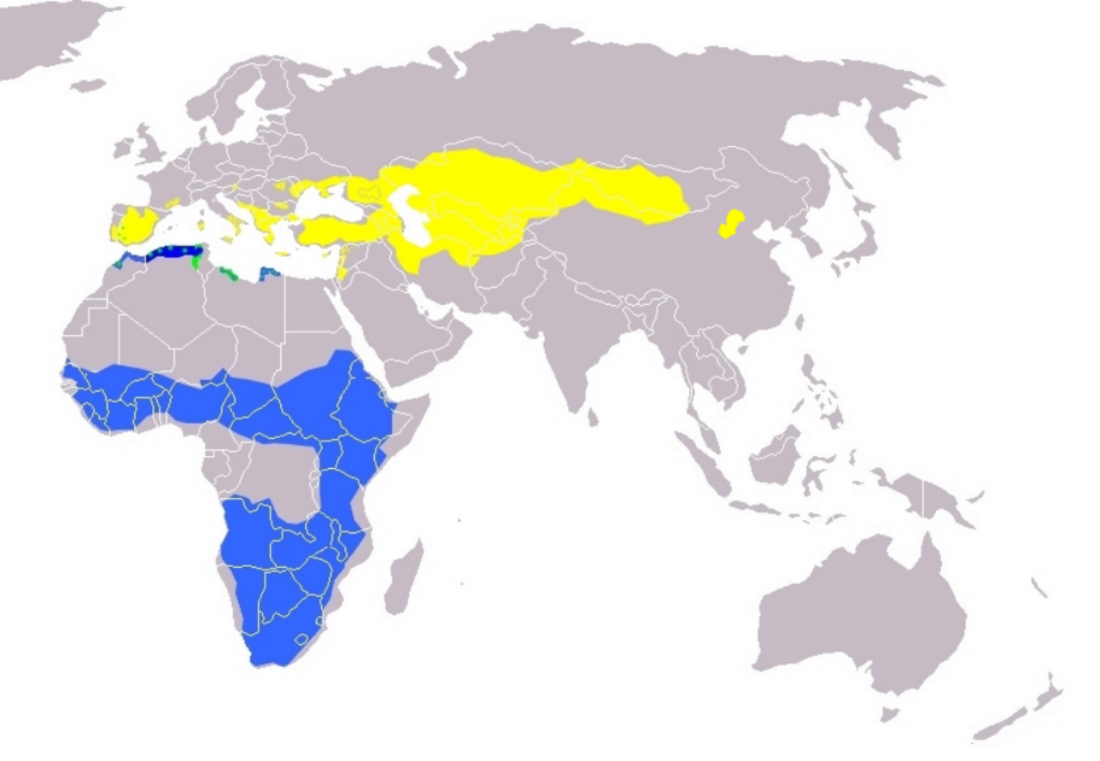
- Range of F. naumanni Breeding range Year-round range Wintering range

= Lesser kestrel =

Species of bird

The lesser kestrel (Falco naumanni) is a small falcon. This species breeds from the Mediterranean across Afghanistan and Central Asia, to China and Mongolia. It is a summer migrant, wintering in Africa and Pakistan and sometimes even to India and Iraq. It is rare north of its breeding range, and declining in its European range. The genus name derives from Late Latin falx, falcis, a sickle, referencing the claws of the bird, and the species name commemorates the German naturalist Johann Friedrich Naumann.

== Description ==
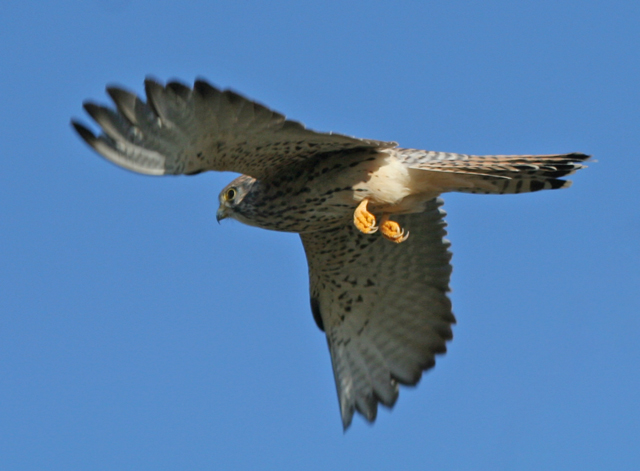
Female in flight showing whitish talons

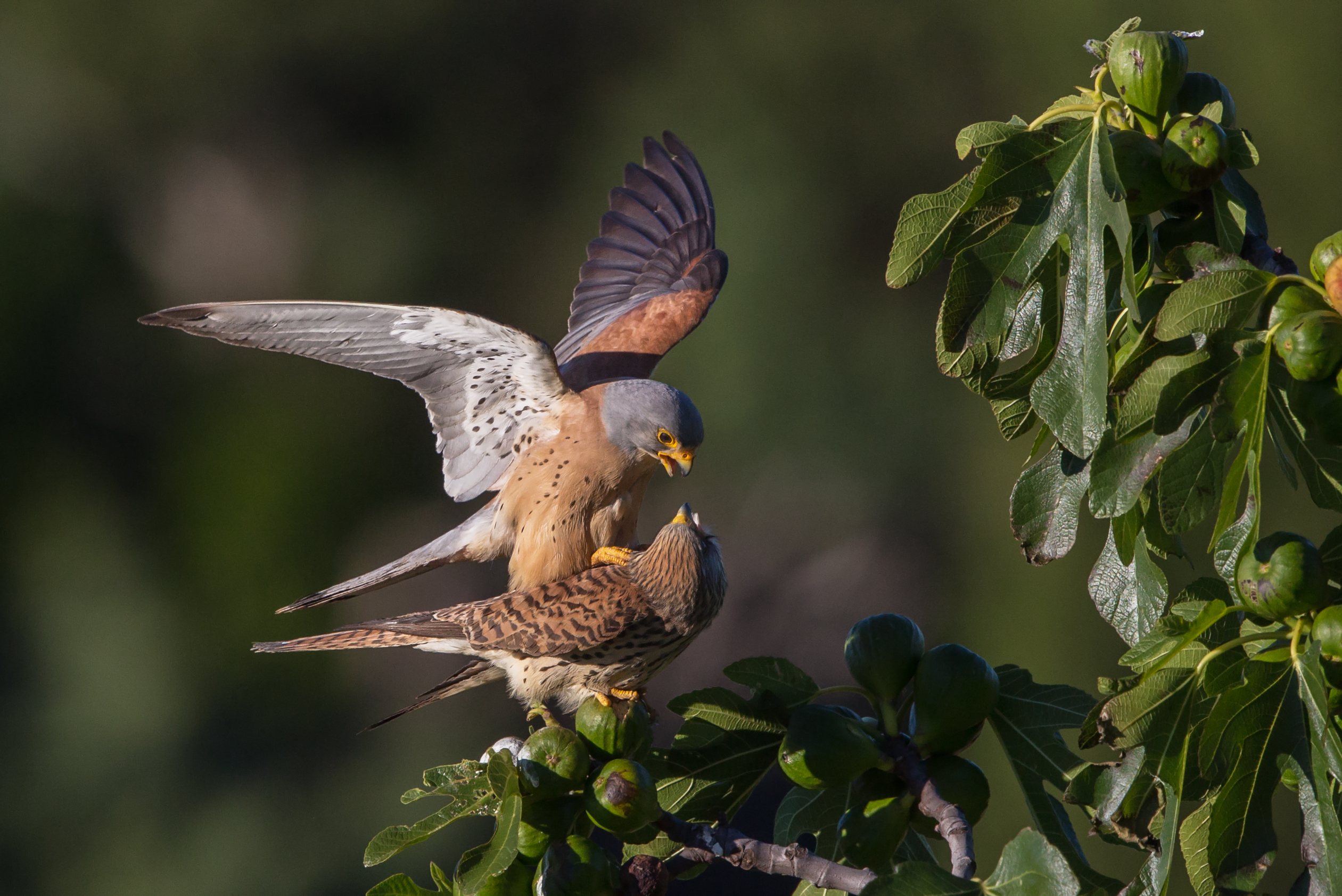
Lesser kestrels mating

It is a small bird of prey, 27–33 cm (11–13 in) in length with a 63–72 cm (25–28 in) wingspan. It looks very much like the larger common kestrel but has proportionally shorter wings and tail. It shares a brown back and barred grey underparts with the larger species. The male has a grey head and tail like male common kestrels, but lacks the dark spotting on the back, the black malar stripe, and has grey patches in the wings.

The female and young birds are slightly paler than their relative, but are so similar that call and structure are better guides than plumage. The call is a diagnostic harsh chay-chay-chay, unlike the common kestrel's kee-kee-kee. Neither sex has dark talons as is usual in falcons; those of this species are an unusual whitish-horn colour. This is however only conspicuous when birds are seen at very close range.

== Taxonomy ==
Despite its outward similarity, this species appears not to be closely related to the common kestrel. In fact, mtDNA cytochrome b sequence analysis places it at a basal position with regard to the other "true" kestrels (i.e., excluding the American kestrel and probably the grey African kestrels as well). Its divergence is tentatively placed to around the Miocene-Pliocene boundary (Messinian to Zanclean, or about 7–3.5 mya). The morphological similarity with the common kestrel is puzzling, but it still appears to betray the present species' actual relationships; the lack of a malar stripe seems ancestral for kestrels, and the grey wing colour unites the lesser kestrel with most other Falco species, but not the other true kestrels.

Although currently considered monotypic with no subspecies, a range-wide investigation published in 2025 revealed a deep genetic divide between a southwestern population and a northeastern population, divided by the Caucasus Mountains; the two populations differ markedly in adaptation and ecology, and show only very limited intergradation. The two populations also winter separately, with the southwestern wintering in the Sahel region of tropical northern Africa from Senegal east to Sudan, and the northeastern wintering from Ethiopia south to South Africa.

== Ecology ==
The lesser kestrel is, as the name implies, a smaller and more delicate bird than the common kestrel, and it is entirely sympatric in its breeding range with it; they compete to a limited extent. Thus, the possibility that there is some form of adaptive advantage to the similar colour deserves study. Considering that the lesser kestrel would in fact have an advantage if some would-be predators confused it with the larger species and consequently avoided it, it might be a case of Müllerian mimicry.

The lesser kestrel eats insects, but also small birds, reptiles and rodents (especially mice), which are often taken on the ground. It nests colonially on buildings, cliffs, or in tree holes, laying up to 3–6 eggs. No nest structure is built, which is typical for falcons. On their wintering grounds in West Africa, lesser kestrels favour a "latitude belt" through Senegal where locusts and grasshoppers are plentiful. Surveys of lesser kestrels wintering in January 2007 by the Ligue pour la Protection des Oiseaux revealed them roosting communally. A roost in Senegal discovered during one of the surveys held 28,600 birds, together with 16,000 scissor-tailed kites Chelictinia riocourii.

It is widespread and plentiful on a global scale, and the IUCN have classed it as Least Concern. Apart from possible habitat destruction, it appears that indiscriminate use of pesticides has a strong effect on this species due to its insectivorous habits.

== Gallery ==
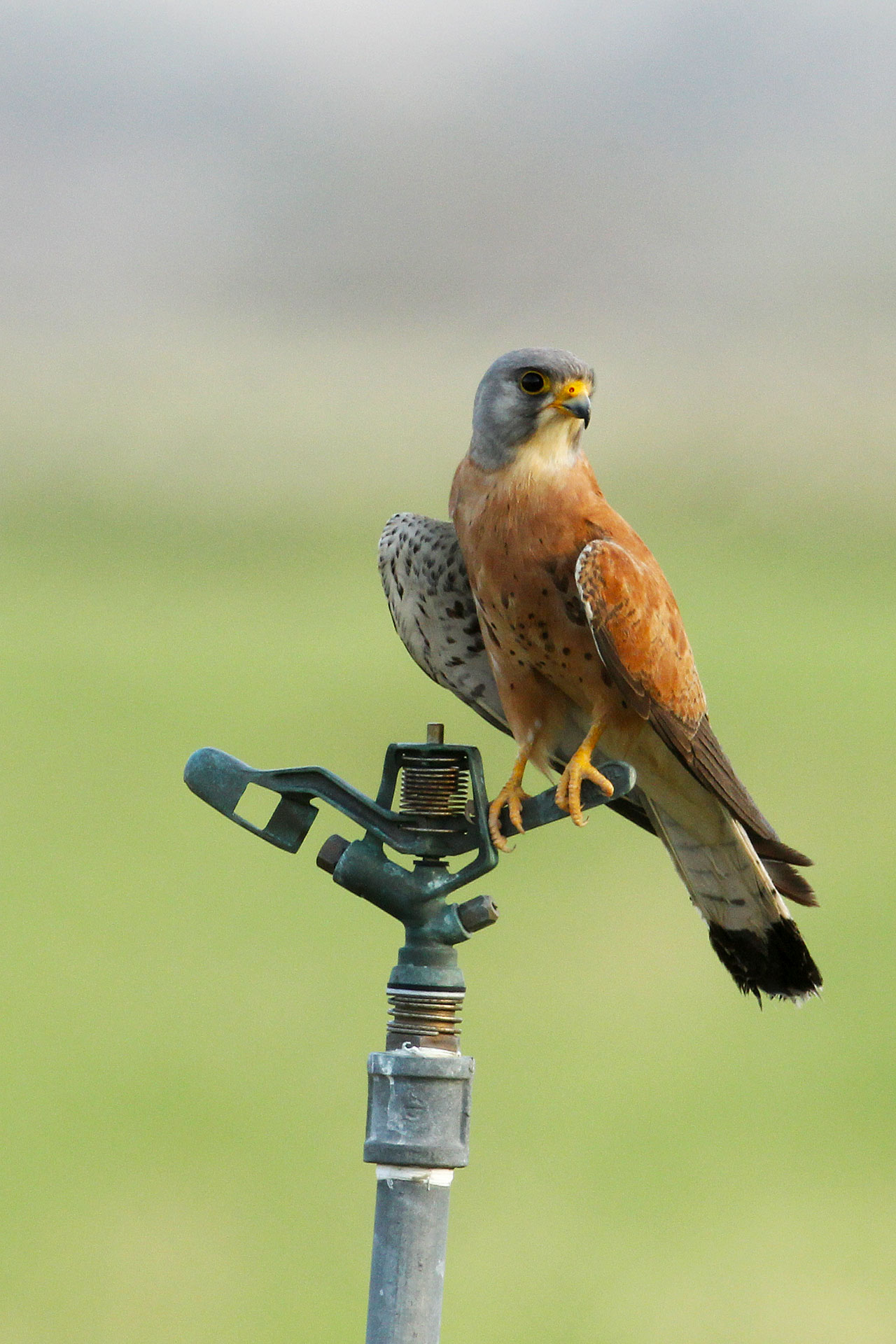
Lesser Kestrel from Fujeirah

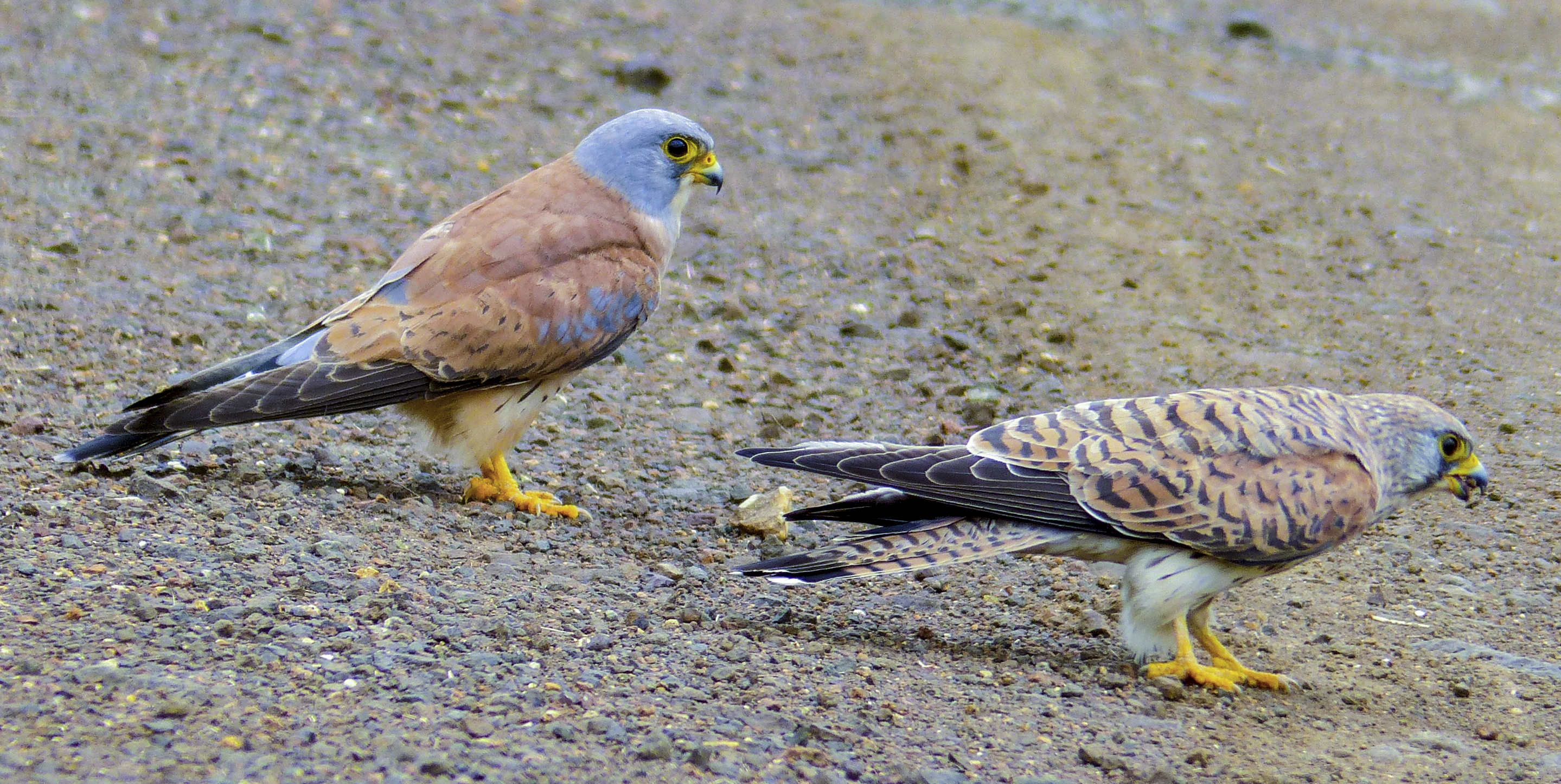
Pair on the wintering grounds in South Africa

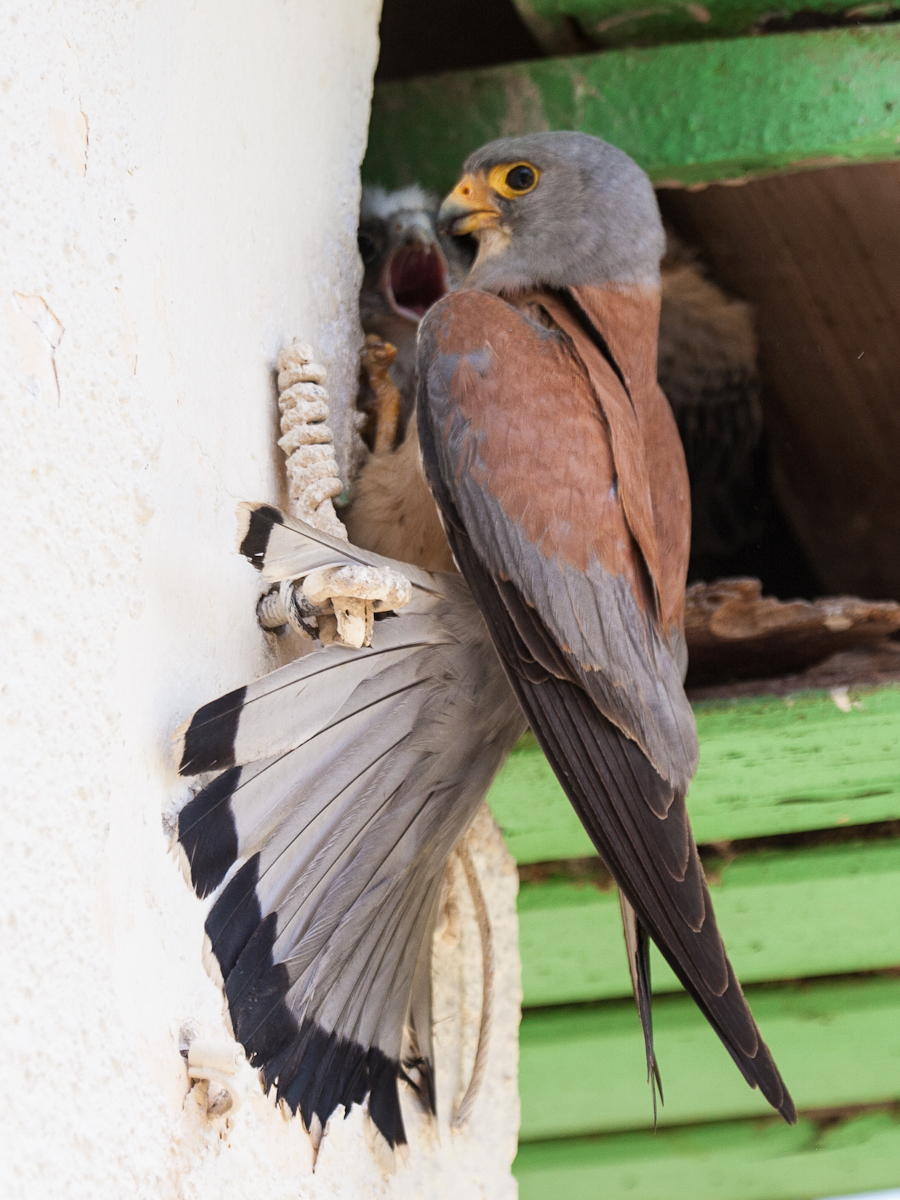
Male lesser kestrel feeding chicks

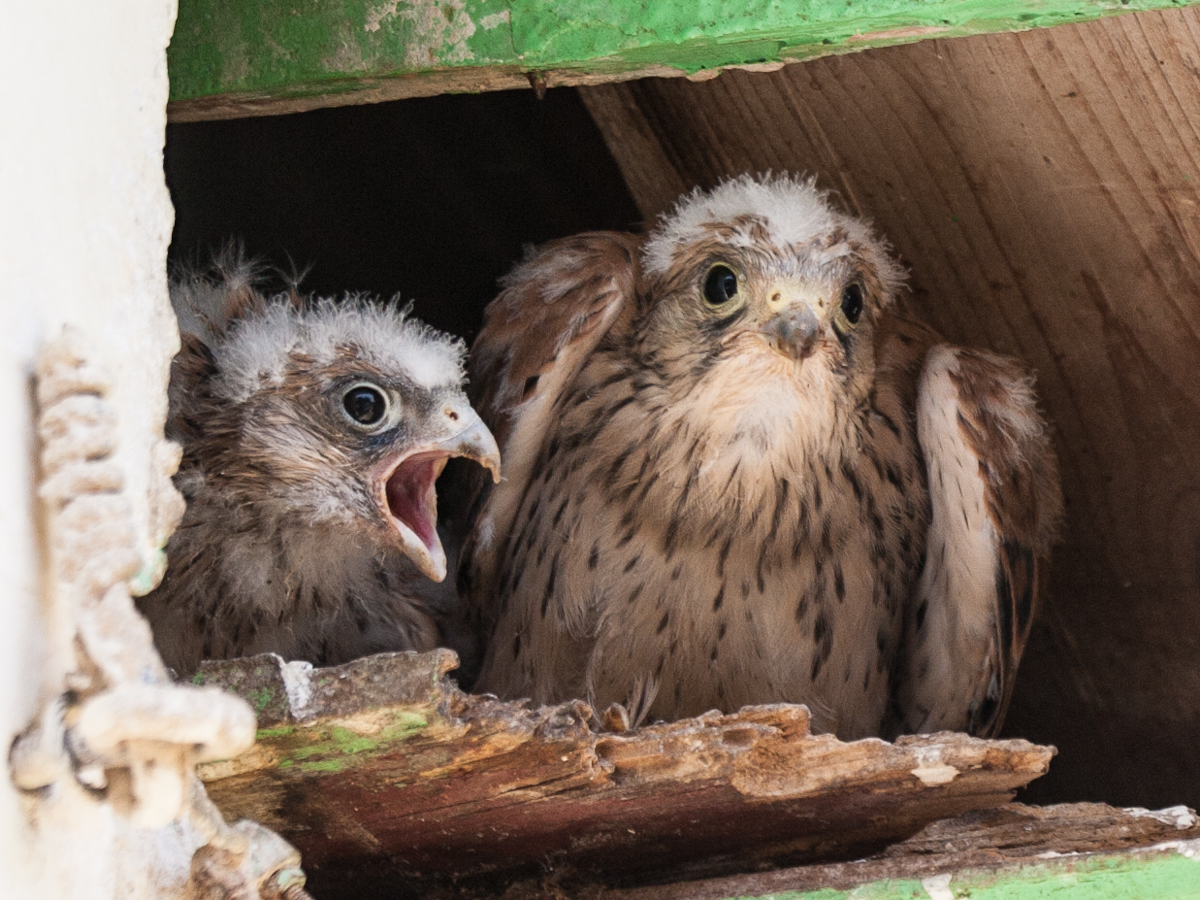
Chicks of the lesser kestrel

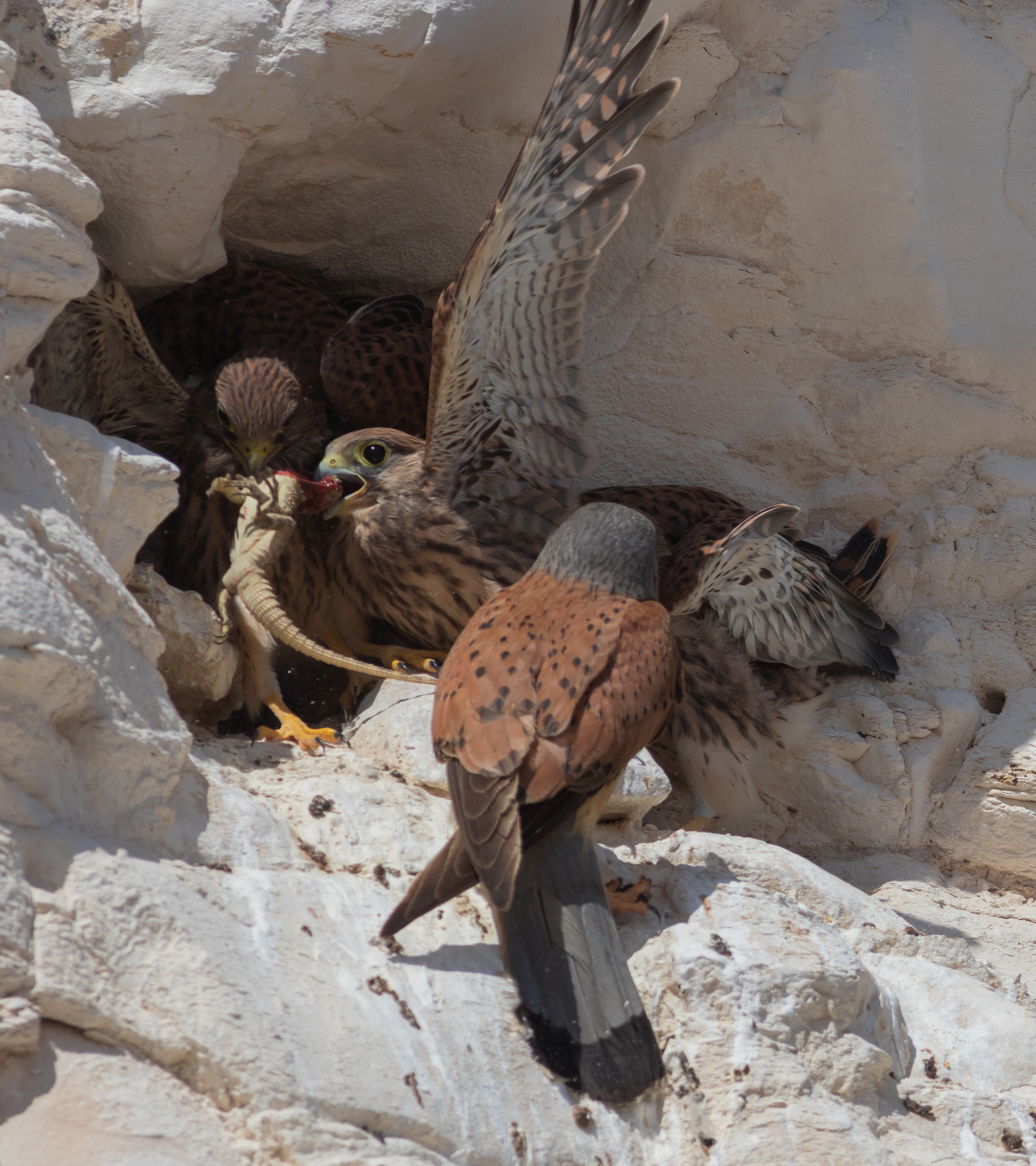
Male lesser kestrel feeding his chicks with Laudakia stellio, Negev desert, Israel

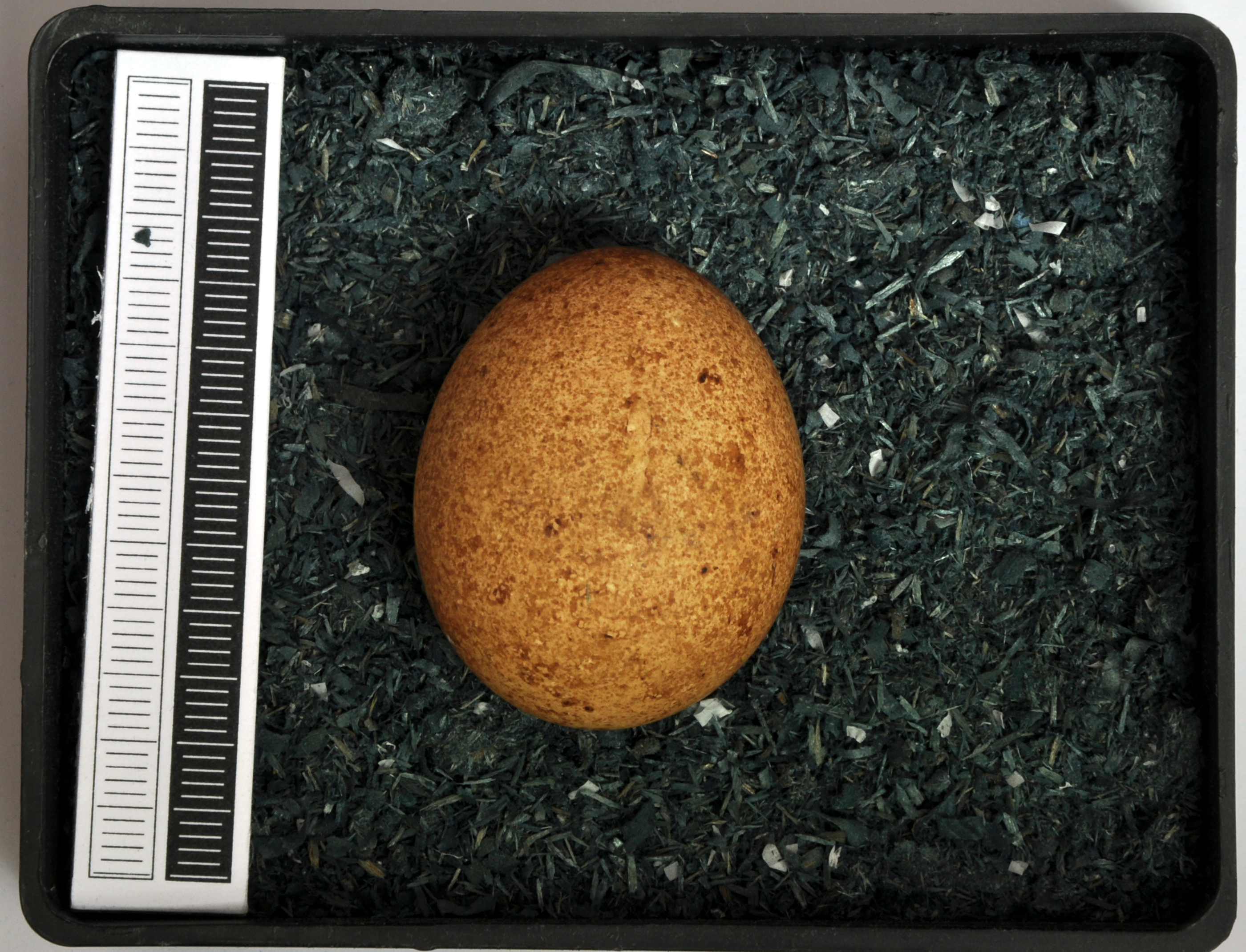
Egg, Collection Museum Wiesbaden

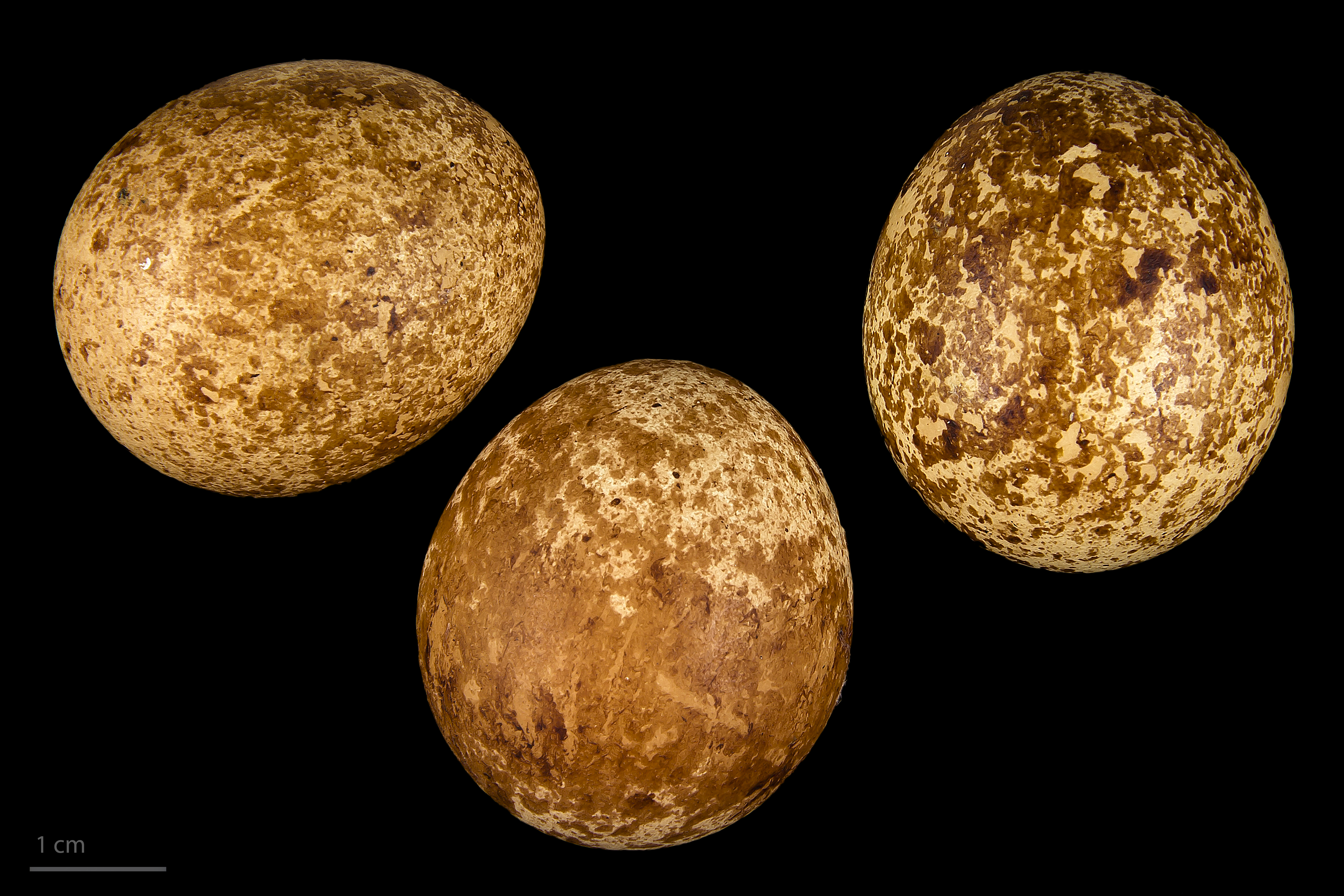
Eggs, Collection MHNT
