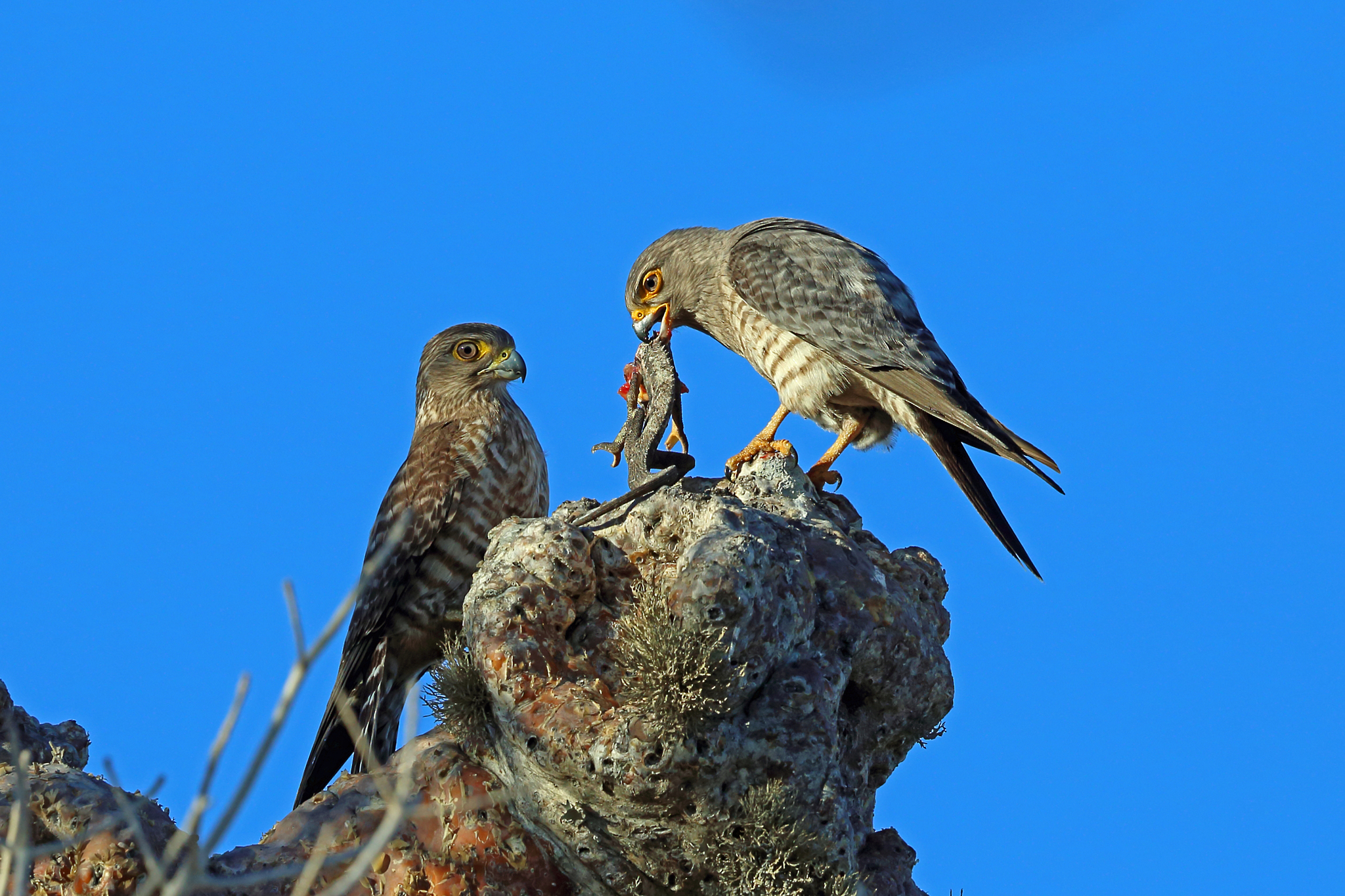
- Pair feeding on a chameleon
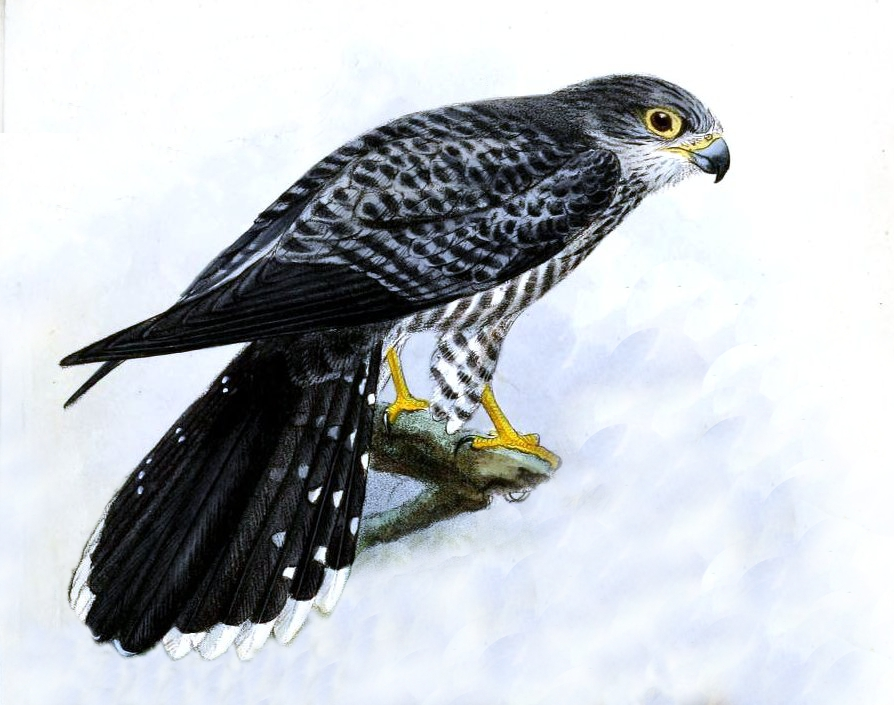
- 1874 illustration

Conservation status
- Least Concern (IUCN 3.1)

Scientific classification
- Kingdom: Animalia
- Phylum: Chordata
- Class: Aves
- Order: Falconiformes
- Family: Falconidae
- Genus: Falco
- Species: F. zoniventris

Binomial name
- Falco zoniventris Peters, 1854

= Banded kestrel =

Species of bird

The banded kestrel (Falco zoniventris) is a bird of prey belonging to the falcon family Falconidae. It is endemic to Madagascar and is also known as the Madagascar banded kestrel, barred kestrel or Madagascar barred kestrel. Its closest relatives are the grey kestrel and Dickinson's kestrel of mainland Africa and the three are sometimes placed in the subgenus Dissodectes.

== Characteristics ==
It is 27–30 cm long with a wingspan of 60–68 cm. The upperparts are grey and the tail is dark. The underparts are whitish with dark grey streaks on the throat and upper breast and dark grey barring on the lower breast and belly. The feet, eyes and cere are yellow and there is bare yellow skin around the eye. Juvenile birds are browner than the adults with darker eyes and less bare skin around the eye.

The species has a shrill, staccato, chattering call and a sharp, screaming call but is usually silent outside the breeding season.

It is fairly common in the southern and western parts of Madagascar but more local in the north and east and absent from the central plateau. It occurs from sea level up to 2000 metres. It inhabits clearings and edges in forest and woodland.

It rarely hovers, preferring to hunt from a perch. It feeds on small reptiles such as chamaeleons and day geckos, large insects such as grasshoppers and beetles and occasionally on birds. Prey is caught on the ground or snatched from a branch or tree trunk.

Breeding takes place from September to December. The nest is a simple scrape, usually in the old nest of another bird, especially the sickle-billed vanga. The nest is located in a tree hole or amongst epiphytic growth. Three yellowish eggs are laid.
