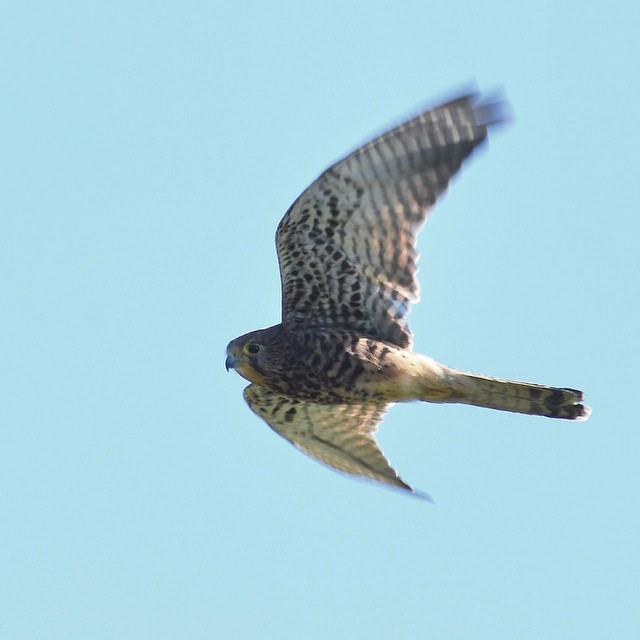

Conservation status
- Least Concern (IUCN 3.1)

Scientific classification
- Kingdom: Animalia
- Phylum: Chordata
- Class: Aves
- Order: Falconiformes
- Family: Falconidae
- Genus: Falco
- Species: F. moluccensis

Binomial name
- Falco moluccensis (Bonaparte, 1850)

Subspecies
- Falcon moluccensis moluccenis; Falcon moluccensis microbalius

= Spotted kestrel =

Species of bird

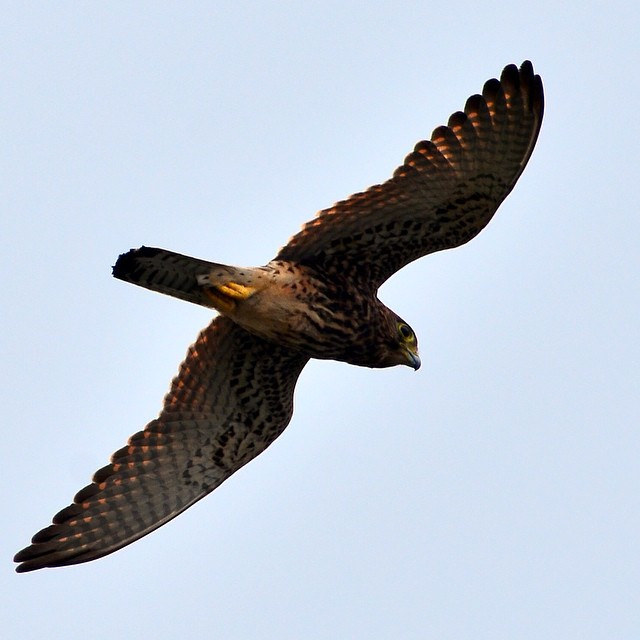
A spotted kestrel in flight

The spotted kestrel (Falco moluccensis), also known as the Moluccan kestrel, is a falcon found throughout Indonesia and Timor-Leste.

== Taxonomy ==
Little is known about the spotted kestrel, although it is thought to be closely related to the nankeen kestrel (Falco cenchroides). Both species are considered members of the Falco tinnunculus group.

== Distribution and habitat ==
Spread through Wallacea and Java, the spotted kestrel inhabits grasslands with scattered trees, lightly wooded cultivation, and the edges of primary and tall secondary forest. Along logging roads, it occasionally penetrates forests, and sometimes inhabits clearings within forested areas. It has also been known to live in areas of human habitation.

It is likely they have small habitat ranges. They move around during the wet and dry seasons. This is information is inferred by comparing the movements of the nankeen kestrel (F. cenchroides), their closest relative. Both species are known to be more sedentary when compared to the common kestrel (F. tinnunculus).

== Description ==
Spotted kestrels measure 26–32 cm (10–12.5 in) from head to tail, with a wingspan of 59–71 cm (23–28 in). On average, spotted kestrels weigh 162 g (5.7 oz). The sexual dimorphism in size and plumage is less pronounced than that of the common kestrel.

Males have grey tails with one broad subterminal band with white tips. Females also have grey tails with white tips, although they have 9 dark bands. Juveniles are very similar to females, but they appear more darker and heavily marked.

The eggs resemble that of the common kestrel. The colour and shape of the egg is similar to Oriental hobby (Falco severus).

== Behaviour ==
The spotted kestrel displays similar habits to that of the common kestrel, although spotted kestrels live more sedentary lives when compared to their sister group F. tinnunculus.

=== Reproduction ===
Little is known about their breeding habits. Spotted kestrels have been observed to be in a pre-breeding behaviour in June–July during the dry season, and in one instance breeding was observed in August. However, they also displayed breeding behaviour in December–January, during the wet season. It may be possible that they breed during both seasons, although more information is needed.

=== Diet ===
The feeding behaviour of the spotted kestrel is not well known, but much of the diet can be assumed by looking at their closest relative, the nankeen kestrel (F. cenchroides). From this, it is assumed spotted kestrel feeds primarily on small mammals, birds (mostly waterfowl and doves), lizards, and insects.

On Christmas Island, an island south of Java, nankeen kestrels have colonized the island. The giant grasshopper (V. irregularis) consisted 97% of their caught prey. Insects are preyed on the most, but vertebrates make up the weight of their diet. They have also been seen preying on spotted dove, western bearded dragons, mice, and other birds such as the common starlings.

=== Nesting ===
The spotted kestrel can be found occupying human-made structures, abandoned nests, and cliff sides in similar nesting habits to other kestrels. In Indonesia, nests were found in a variety of locations, including the peaked roofs of traditional houses or in the crowns of palm trees. Nests are usually occupied from March through September or October during mating season. Similar to other falcons, the spotted kestrel does not build its own nests. Instead, it lays its eggs in abandoned nests built by other raptors or corvids.

When looking at the nesting behaviour of their sister taxon (nankeen kestrel), clutch sizes range from 3–5 eggs. Incubation periods last up to 28 days. Males were seen assisting the females with the incubation. The fledging period last for 31 to 35 days.

== See also ==
- Falcon
