= List of mammals of Andorra =

This is a list of the mammal species recorded in Andorra. There are seventy-nine mammal species in Andorra. This list is derived from the IUCN Red List which lists species of mammals and includes those mammals that have recently been classified as extinct (since 1500 AD).

Icons which state each species' global IUCN status:
EX	Extinct	No reasonable doubt that the last individual has died
EN	Endangered	Facing an extremely high risk of extinction in the wild
VU	Vulnerable	Facing a high risk of extinction in the wild
NT	Near Threatened	Doesn't meet any criteria that would categorise it as risking extinction but likely to in the future
LC	Least Concern	No current identifiable risks to this species

== Order: Artiodactyla (even-toed ungulates) ==
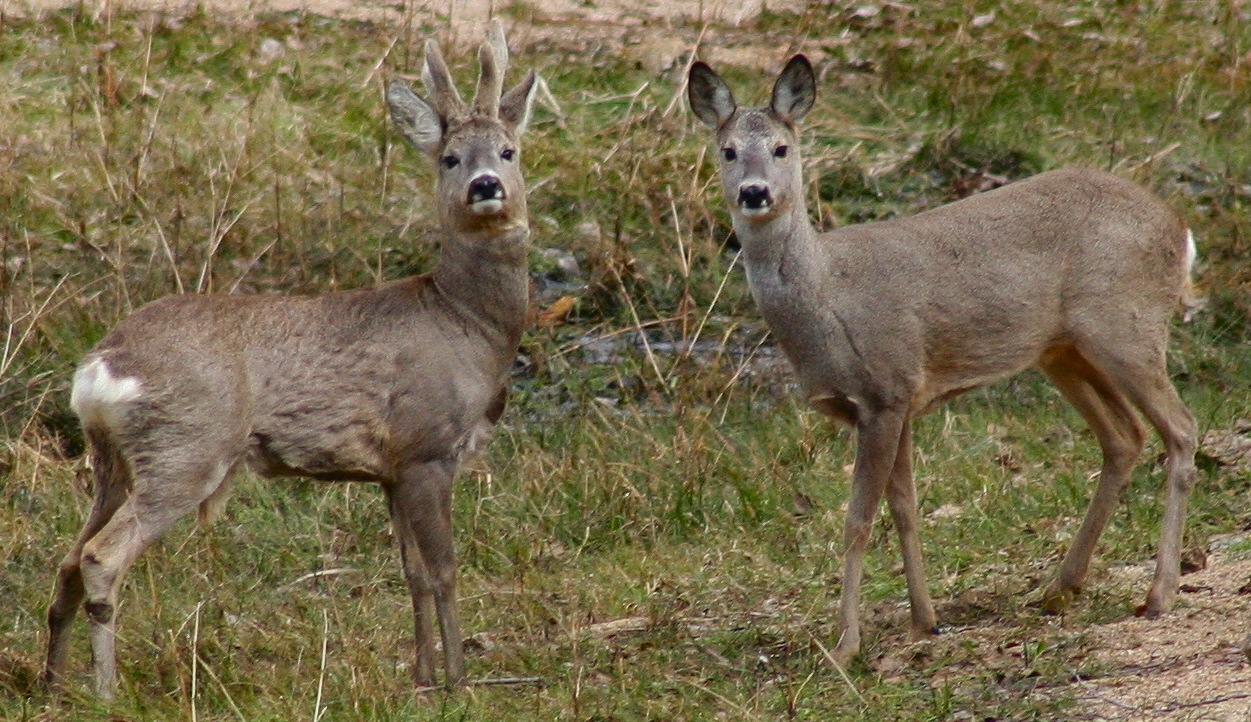
Roe deer

The even-toed ungulates are ungulates whose weight is borne about equally by the third and fourth toes, rather than mostly or entirely by the third as in perissodactyls. There are about 360 artiodactyl species, including many that are of great economic importance to humans. This group also includes cetaceans.

- Family: Suidae (pigs)
  - Subfamily: Suinae
    - Genus: Sus
      - Wild boar, S. scrofa LC
- Family: Cervidae (deer)
  - Subfamily: Cervinae
    - Genus: Cervus
      - Red deer, C. elaphus LC
        - European red deer, C. e. elaphus
    - Genus: Dama
      - Fallow deer, D. dama LC introduced
  - Subfamily: Capreolinae
    - Genus: Capreolus
      - Western roe deer, C. capreolus LC
        - European roe deer, C. c. capreolus
- Family: Bovidae (bovids)
  - Subfamily: Bovinae
    - Genus: Bos
      - Domestic cattle, B. taurus (introduced)
    - Genus: Bison
      - European bison, B. bonasus NT
  - Subfamily: Antilopinae
    - Genus: Capra
      - Iberian ibex, Capra pyrenaica LC
        - Pyrenean ibex, C. p. pyrenaica EX
        - Western Spanish ibex, C. p. victoriae (introduced)
    - Genus: Ovis
      - Domestic sheep, O. aries NA
      - Mouflon, O. gmelini NT (introduced)
    - Genus: Rupicapra
      - Pyrenean chamois, R. pyrenaica LC
        - Pyrenean chamois, R. p. pyrenaica

== Order: Carnivora (carnivorans) ==
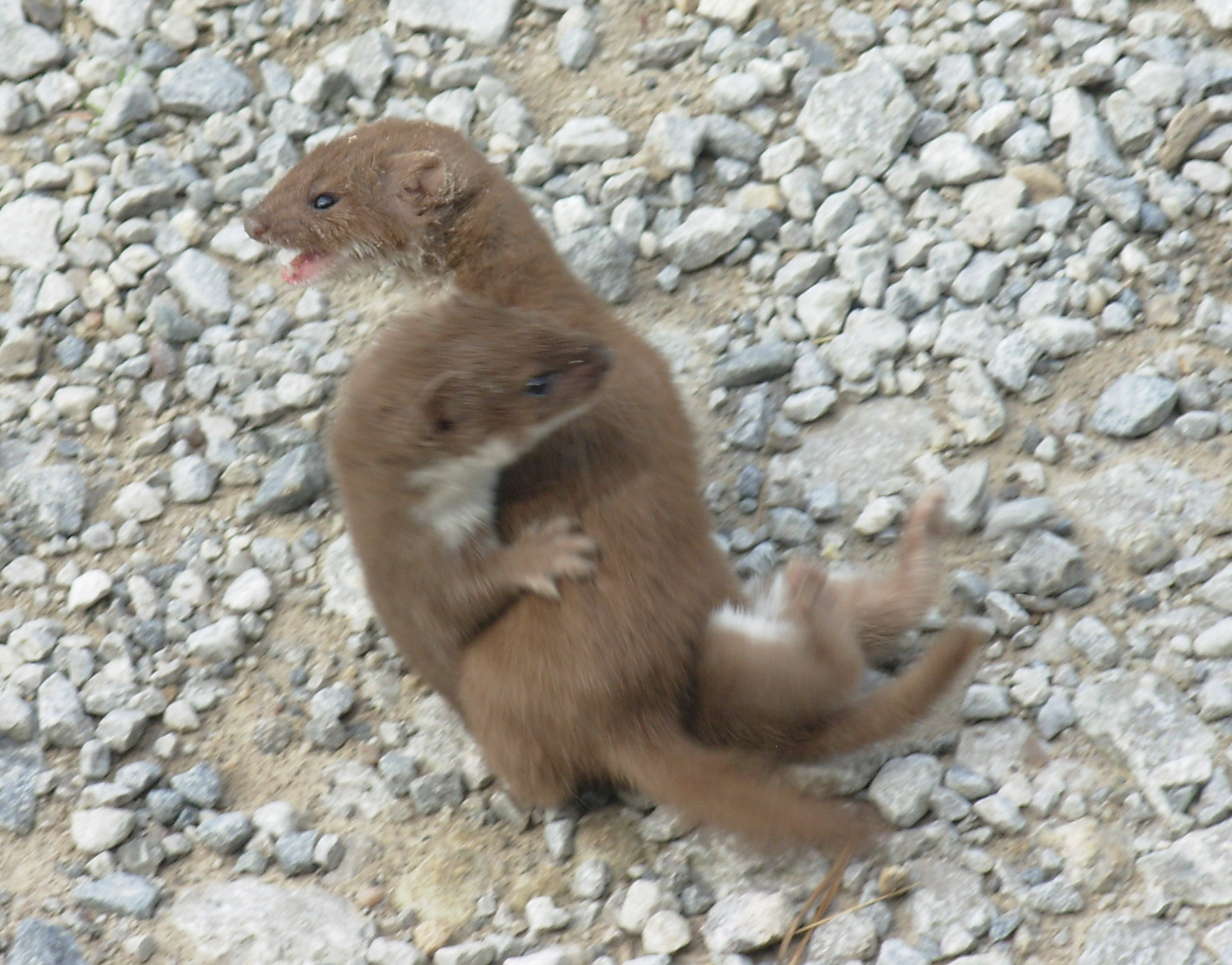
Least weasel

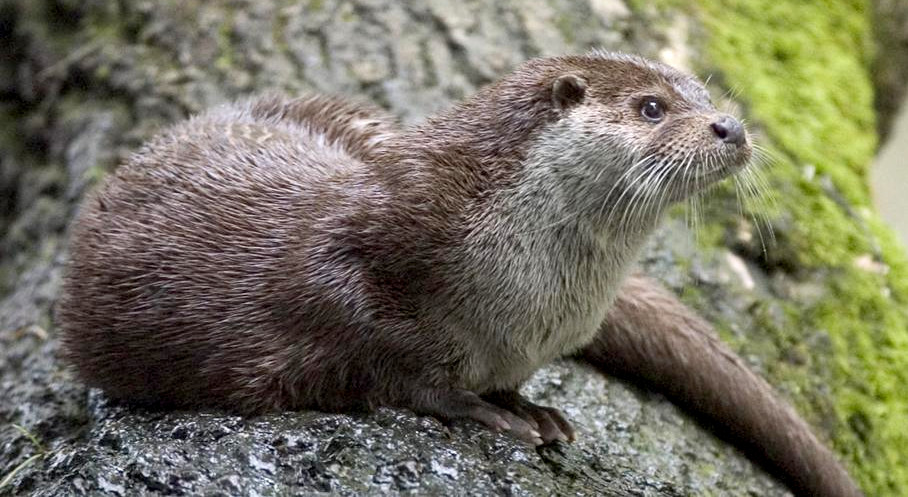
European otter

There are over 310 species of carnivorans, the majority of which feed primarily on meat. They have a characteristic skull shape and dentition.

- Suborder: Feliformia
  - Family: Felidae (cats)
    - Subfamily: Felinae
      - Genus: Felis
        - European wildcat, F. silvestris LC
  - Family: Viverridae
    - Subfamily: Viverrinae
      - Genus: Genetta
        - Common genet, G. genetta LC introduced
- Suborder: Caniformia
  - Family: Canidae (dogs, foxes)
    - Genus: Canis
      - Golden jackal, C. aureus LC vagrant
      - Gray wolf, C. lupus LC
        - Eurasian wolf, C. l. lupus
    - Genus: Vulpes
      - Red fox, V. vulpes LC
  - Family: Mustelidae (weasels, stoats, & allies)
    - Subfamily: Guloninae
      - Genus: Martes
        - European pine marten, M. martes LC
        - Stone marten, M. foina LC
    - Subfamily: Lutrinae
      - Genus: Lutra
        - European otter, L. lutra NT
    - Subfamily: Melinae
      - Genus: Meles
        - European badger, M. meles LC
    - Subfamily: Mustelinae
      - Genus: Mustela
        - Stoat, M. erminea LC
        - Least weasel, M. nivalis LC
        - European polecat, M. putorius LC
  - Family: Ursidae (bears)
    - Genus: Ursus
      - Brown bear, U. arctos LC
        - Eurasian brown bear, U. a. arctos

== Order: Chiroptera (bats) ==
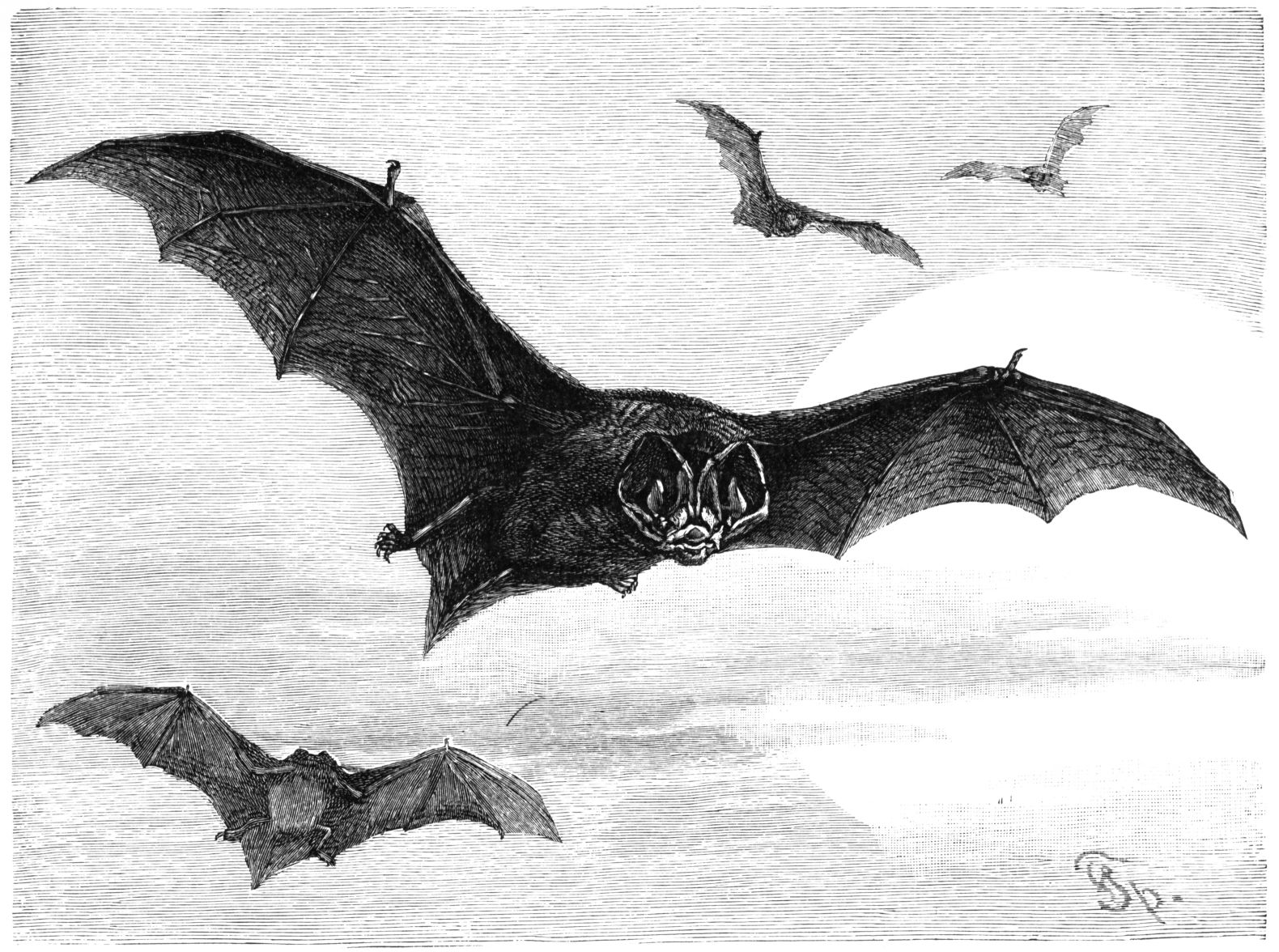
Barbastelle

The bats' most distinguishing feature is that their forelimbs are developed as wings, making them the only mammals capable of flight. Bat species account for about 20% of all mammals, with almost 1,500 species described.

- Family: Molossidae
  - Genus: Tadarida
    - European free-tailed bat, T. teniotis LC
- Family: Rhinolophidae
  - Subfamily: Rhinolophinae
    - Genus: Rhinolophus
      - Mediterranean horseshoe bat, R. euryale NT
      - Lesser horseshoe bat, R. hipposideros LC
      - Greater horseshoe bat, R. ferrumequinum LC
- Family: Vespertilionidae
  - Subfamily: Myotinae
    - Genus: Myotis
      - Bechstein's bat, M. bechsteinii NT
      - Lesser mouse-eared bat, M. blythii LC
      - Long-fingered bat, M. capaccinii VU
      - Cryptic myotis, M. crypticus NT
      - Daubenton's bat, M. daubentonii LC
      - Geoffroy's bat, M. emarginatus LC
      - Escalera's bat, M. escalerai NT
      - Greater mouse-eared bat, M. myotis LC
      - Whiskered bat, M. mystacinus LC
  - Subfamily: Vespertilioninae
    - Genus: Barbastella
      - Western barbastelle, B. barbastellus NT
    - Genus: Eptesicus
      - Serotine bat, E. serotinus LC
    - Genus: Hypsugo
      - Savi's pipistrelle, H. savii LC
    - Genus: Nyctalus
      - Greater noctule, N. lasiopterus VU
      - Lesser noctule, N. leisleri LC
      - Common noctule, N. noctula LC
    - Genus: Pipistrellus
      - Kuhl's pipistrelle, P. kuhlii LC
      - Common pipistrelle, P. pipistrellus LC
      - Kuhl's pipistrelle, P. kuhlii LC
    - Genus: Plecotus
      - Brown long-eared bat, P. auritus LC
      - Grey long-eared bat, P. austriacus NT
      - Alpine long-eared bat, P. macrobullaris LC

== Order: Eulipotyphla (shrews, moles, and solenodons) ==
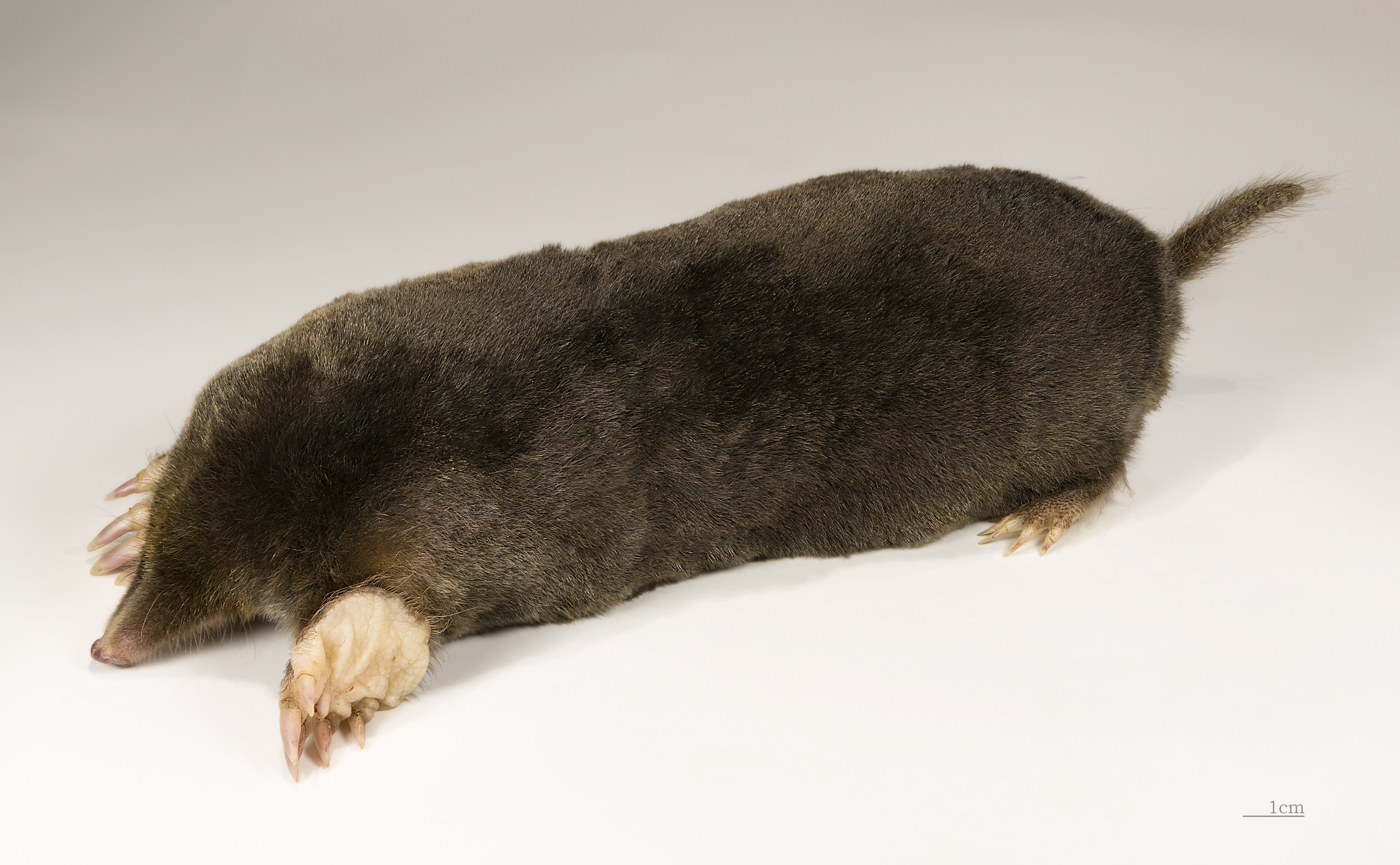
European mole

These are insectivorous mammals. The shrews and solenodons closely resemble mice while the moles are stout-bodied burrowers. There are almost 600 species of eulipotyphlans.

- Family: Soricidae (shrews)
  - Subfamily: Crocidurinae
    - Genus: Crocidura
      - Greater white-toothed shrew, C. russula LC
    - Genus Suncus
      - Pygmy white-toothed shrew, S. etruscus LC
  - Subfamily: Soricinae
    - Genus: Sorex
      - Common shrew, S. araneus LC
      - Crowned shrew, S. coronatus LC
      - Eurasian pygmy shrew, S. minutus LC
    - Genus: Neomys
      - Southern water shrew, N. anomalus LC
      - Eurasian water shrew, N. fodiens LC
- Family: Talpidae (moles)
  - Subfamily: Talpinae
    - Genus: Talpa
      - European mole, T. europaea LC
    - Genus: Galemys
      - Pyrenean desman, G. pyrenaicus EN

== Order: Lagomorpha (hares, rabbits, & pikas) ==
Moderately small herbivores related to rodents, but with long ears, large hindlegs, and four incisors rather than two on the top jaw. They move primarily hopping and bounding. There are over 100 species of lagomorph.

- Family: Leporidae
  - Genus: Lepus
    - European hare, L. europaeus LC
  - Genus: Oryctolagus
    - European rabbit, O. cuniculus NT

== Order: Perissodactyla (odd-toed ungulates) ==
The odd-toed ungulates are browsing and grazing mammals. They are usually large to very large, and have relatively simple stomachs and a large middle toe. There are only around 20 species of perissodactyl.

- Family: Equidae (horses & allies)
  - Genus: Equus
    - Wild horse, E. ferus
      - Domestic horse, E. f. caballus introduced
      - Wild horse, E. f. ferus EX
    - Donkey, E. asinus introduced

== Order: Rodentia (rodents) ==
Rodents make up the largest order of mammals, with over 40 percent of mammalian species, with almost 2,700 currently described species. They have two incisors in the upper and lower jaw which grow continually and must be kept short by gnawing.

- Suborder: Myomorpha
  - Family: Cricetidae (hamsters, voles, & allies)
    - Subfamily: Arvicolinae
      - Genus: Arvicola
        - European water vole, A. amphibius LC (sometimes split into Arvicola scherman LC)
        - Southwestern water vole, A. sapidus VU
      - Genus: Chionomys
        - European snow vole, C. nivalis LC
      - Genus: Clethrionomys
        - Bank vole, C. glareolus LC
      - Genus: Microtus
        - Field vole, M. agrestis LC
        - Common vole, M. arvalis LC
        - Mediterranean pine vole, M. duodecimcostatus LC
        - Pyrenean pine vole, M. pyrenaicus LC
  - Family: Muridae (Old World rats, Old World mice, & allies.)
    - Subfamily: Murinae
      - Genus: Apodemus
        - Yellow-necked mouse, A. flavicollis LC
        - Wood mouse, A. sylvaticus LC
      - Genus: Mus
        - House mouse, M. musculus LC
      - Genus: Rattus
        - Brown rat, R. norvegicus LC
        - Black rat, R. rattus LC
- Suborder: Sciuromorpha
  - Family: Gliridae (dormice)
    - Subfamily: Glirinae
      - Genus: Glis
        - European edible dormouse, G. glis LC
    - Subfamily: Leithiinae
      - Genus: Eliomys
        - Garden dormouse, E. quercinus NT
  - Family: Sciuridae
    - Subfamily: Sciurinae
      - Genus: Sciurus
        - Eurasian red squirrel, S. vulgaris LC
    - Subfamily: Xerinae
      - Genus: Marmota
        - Alpine marmot, M. marmota LC introduced

== See also ==
- List of chordate orders
- List of prehistoric mammals
- Mammal classification
- List of mammals described in the 2000s
