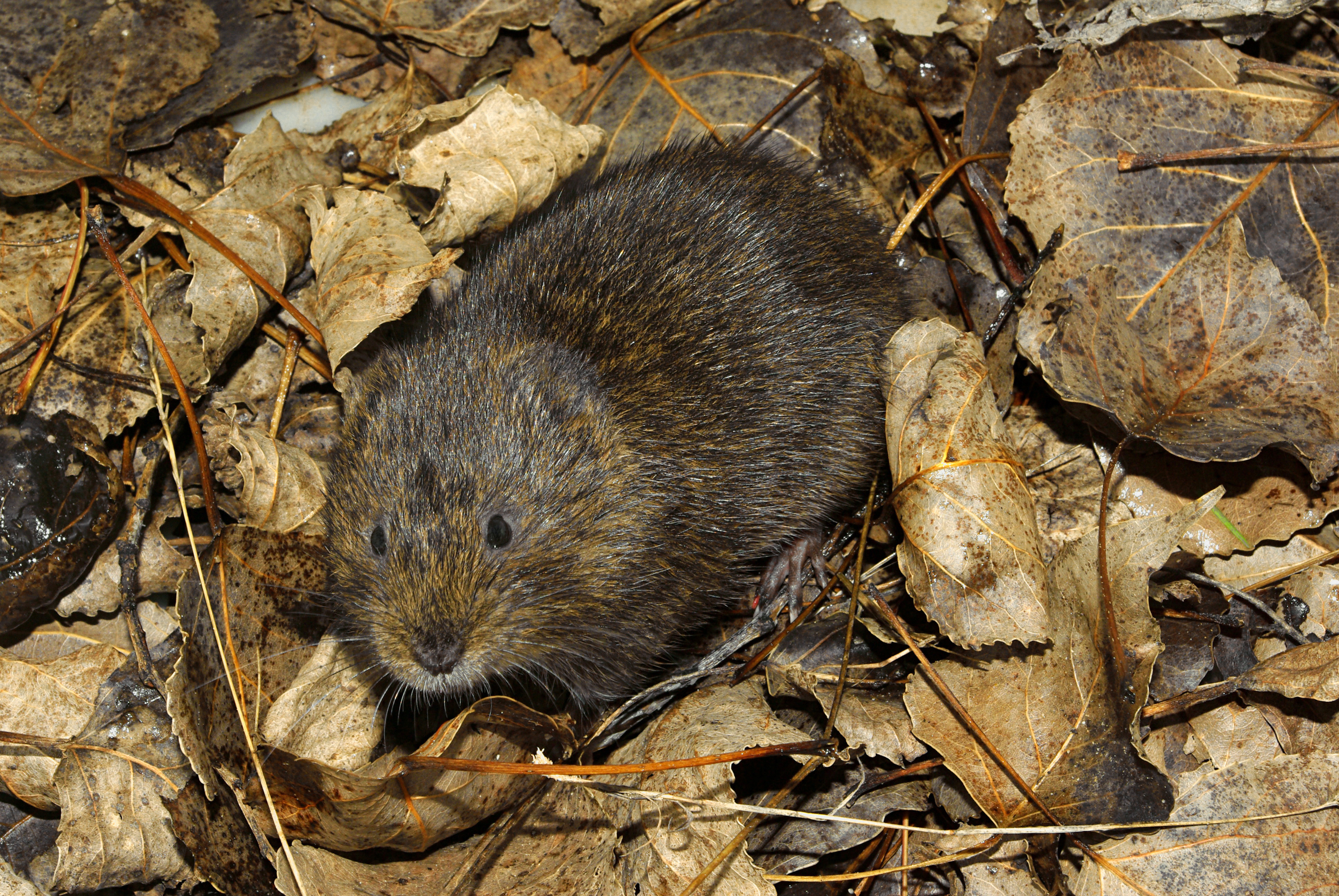
- Arvicola sapidus

Scientific classification
- Kingdom: Animalia
- Phylum: Chordata
- Class: Mammalia
- Infraclass: Placentalia
- Order: Rodentia
- Family: Cricetidae
- Subfamily: Arvicolinae
- Tribe: Arvicolini; Gray, 1821

Genera
- Arvicola †Mimomys

= Arvicolini =

Tribe of rodents

Arvicolini is a tribe of voles in the subfamily Arvicolinae.

A 2021 study found that Arvicola is distinct from the other extant genera in the tribe, instead being sister to the tribe Lagurini. The current species listing of the American Society of Mammalogists lists only Arvicola in this tribe, with all other extant members being removed to Microtini.

== List of species ==
Tribe Arvicolini

- Genus Arvicola - water voles
  - European (or Northern) water vole, Arvicola amphibius (Arvicola terrestris)
  - Southwestern (or Southern) water vole, Arvicola sapidus
  - Montane water vole, Arvicola scherman

=== Fossil genera ===
- Genus Mimomys - Plio-Pleistocene
