= Water vole =

Water vole may refer to:

- In North America, the North American water vole (Microtus richardsoni)
- In Eurasia, the three species of the genus Arvicola:
  - European water vole (Arvicola amphibius; previously Arvicola terrestris)
  - Southwestern water vole (Arvicola sapidus)
  - Montane water vole (Arvicola scherman)
