= Waterhole =

Waterhole or water hole may refer to:

- Watering hole, a depression in the ground in which water can collect, or a more permanent pool in the bed of an ephemeral river
- Water hole (radio), an especially quiet region of the electromagnetic spectrum
- Waterhole, Alberta, Canada
- The Water Hole, a 1928 Western film
- Waterhole No. 3, a 1967 Western comedy film, a comic remake of The Good, the Bad, and the Ugly

== See also ==
- Water vole (disambiguation)
- Water well, an excavated hole that is dug to provide water
- Watergate (architecture), a fortified gate to allow water into a fortification
- Watering hole (disambiguation)
