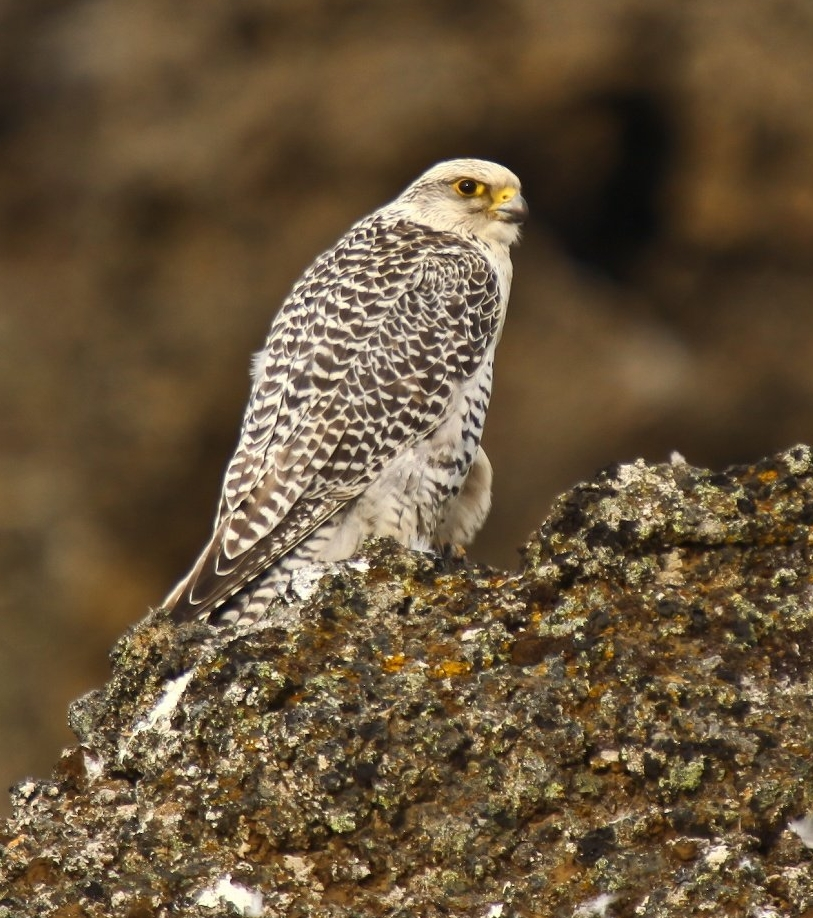

Conservation status
- Least Concern (IUCN 3.1)
- CITES Appendix I

Scientific classification
- Kingdom: Animalia
- Phylum: Chordata
- Class: Aves
- Order: Falconiformes
- Family: Falconidae
- Genus: Falco
- Subgenus: Hierofalco
- Species: F. rusticolus

Binomial name
- Falco rusticolus Linnaeus, 1758
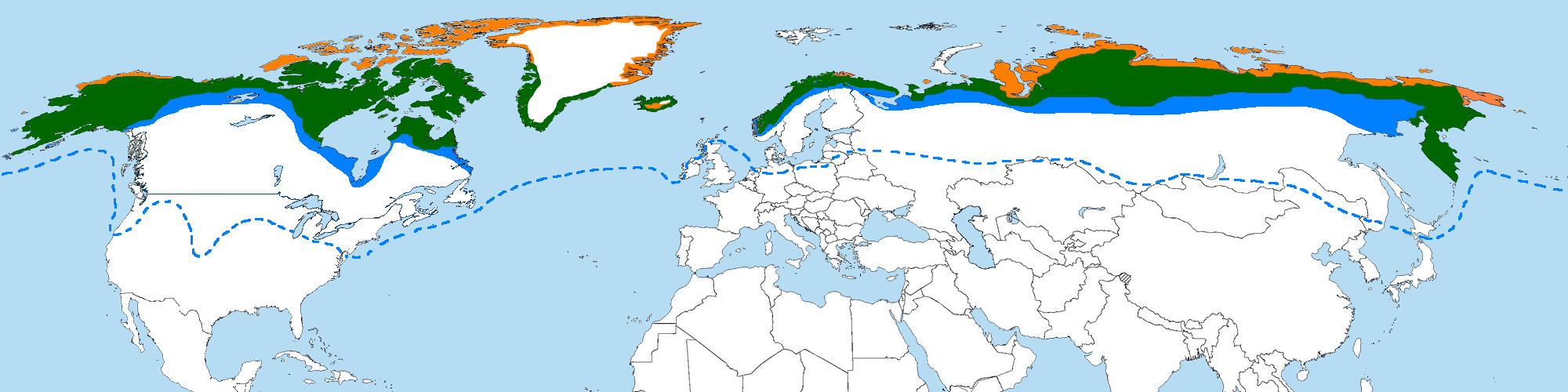
- Breeding (summer); Breeding (resident); Regular winter visitor Blue dash: approximate southern limits of winter vagrancy

Synonyms
- List: Falco arcticus Holbøll, 1843; Falco candicans Gmelin, 1788; Falco gyrfalco Linnaeus, 1758; Falco islandus Brünnich, 1764; Falco obsoletus Gmelin, 1788; Falco rusticolus candicans Gmelin, 1788; Falco rusticolus grebnitzkii (Severtzov, 1885); Falco rusticolus intermedius Gloger, 1834; Falco rusticolus islandus Brünnich, 1764 (but see text); Falco rusticolus obsoletus Gmelin, 1788; Falco rusticolus rusticolus Linnaeus, 1758; Falco swarthi L.H. Miller, 1927; Hierofalco grebnitzkii Severtzov, 1885); Hierofalco islandus (Brünnich, 1764); Hierofalco rusticolus (Linnaeus, 1758); Hierofalco rusticolus candicans (Gmelin, 1788)

= Gyrfalcon =

Species of bird

Gyrfalcon call.

The gyrfalcon (/ˈdʒɜːrˌfɔː(l)kən/ or /ˈdʒɜːrˌfælkən/) (Falco rusticolus), also abbreviated as gyr, is a bird of prey and the largest species in the falcon family, Falconidae. A high-latitude species, the gyrfalcon breeds on the Arctic coasts and tundra, the islands of northern North America and Siberia, where it is mainly a resident species. Some gyrfalcons disperse more widely after the breeding season or in winter, and individual vagrancy can take birds for long distances. Its plumage varies with location, with birds being coloured from all-white to dark grey-brown. These colour variations are called morphs. Like other falcons, it shows sexual dimorphism, with the female much larger than the male.

For centuries, the gyrfalcon has been valued as a hunting bird. Typical prey includes the ptarmigan and waterfowl, which it may attack in flight; and it also hunts fish and small mammals.

== Taxonomy and etymology ==
The gyrfalcon was formally described by Swedish naturalist Carl Linnaeus in 1758 in the tenth edition of his Systema Naturae under its current binomial name Falco rusticolus. The genus name is the Late Latin term for a falcon, Falco, from falx a sickle, referencing the talons of the bird. The species name is from the Latin rusticolus, a countryside-dweller, from rus, "country" and colere, "to dwell". The bird's common name comes from French gerfaucon; in Medieval Latin, it is gyrofalco. The first part of the word may come from Old High German gîr (cf. modern German Geier; ultimately from Proto-Germanic *girį̄ ("greed")) for "vulture", referring to its size in comparison with other falcons; or from the Latin gȳrus for "circle" or "curved path", in turn from the Ancient Greek γῦρος, gûros, meaning "circle" – from the species' circling as it searches for prey, distinct from the hunting of other falcons in its range. (Note: In Scandinavian languages, it is generally named after its use in falconry, whereas the modern Dutch name giervalk is peculiarly ambiguous: gier means "vulture", whereas gieren means changing the yaw angle to circle in the air.) The male gyrfalcon is called a gyrkin in falconry.

== Description ==
The gyrfalcon is the largest falcon in the world, being about the same size as the largest buteos but probably slightly heavier. Males are 48 to 61 centimetres (19 to 24 inches) long, weigh 805 to 1,350 grams (1 pound 12 1/2 ounces to 2 pounds 15 1/2 ounces), with average weights reported as 1,130 or 1,170 g (2 lb 8 oz or 2 lb 9 1/2 oz) and have a wingspan from 110 to 130 cm (43 to 51 in). Females are bulkier and larger, at 51 to 65 cm (20 to 25 1/2 in) long, 124 to 134 cm (49 to 53 in) wingspan, and of 1,180 to 2,100 g (2 lb 9 1/2 oz to 4 lb 10 oz) weight, with average weights of 1,585 or 1,752 g (3 lb 8 oz or 3 lb 13 3/4 oz). An outsized female from eastern Siberia was found to have scaled 2,600 g (5 lb 12 oz). Among standard measurements, the wing chord is 34.5 to 41 cm (13.6 to 16.1 in), the tail is 19.5 to 29 cm (7.7 to 11.4 in), the culmen is 2 to 2.8 cm (3/4 to 1 1/8 in) and the tarsus is 4.9 to 7.5 cm (1 7/8 to 3 in). The gyrfalcon is larger, broader-winged and longer-tailed than the peregrine falcon, which it is known to compete with (and occasionally hunt). It differs from the buzzard in general structure, having pointed wings.

The gyrfalcon is a very polymorphic species, so its plumage varies greatly. The archetypal morphs are called "white", "silver", "brown", and "black", though they can be coloured on a spectrum from all-white to very dark. The brown form of the gyrfalcon is distinguished from the peregrine by the cream streaking on the nape and crown and by the absence of a well-defined malar stripe and cap. The black morph is similar but has a strongly black-spotted underside, rather than finely barred as in the peregrine and the brown-morph gyrfalcon. White form gyrfalcons are the only predominantly white falcons. Silver gyrfalcons resemble a light grey lanner falcon of larger size. The species shows no sex-based colour differences; juveniles are darker and browner than adults.

The black colour seems to be sex-linked and to occur mostly in females; it proved difficult for breeders to get males darker than the dark side of slate grey. A colour variety that arose in captive breeding is "black chick".

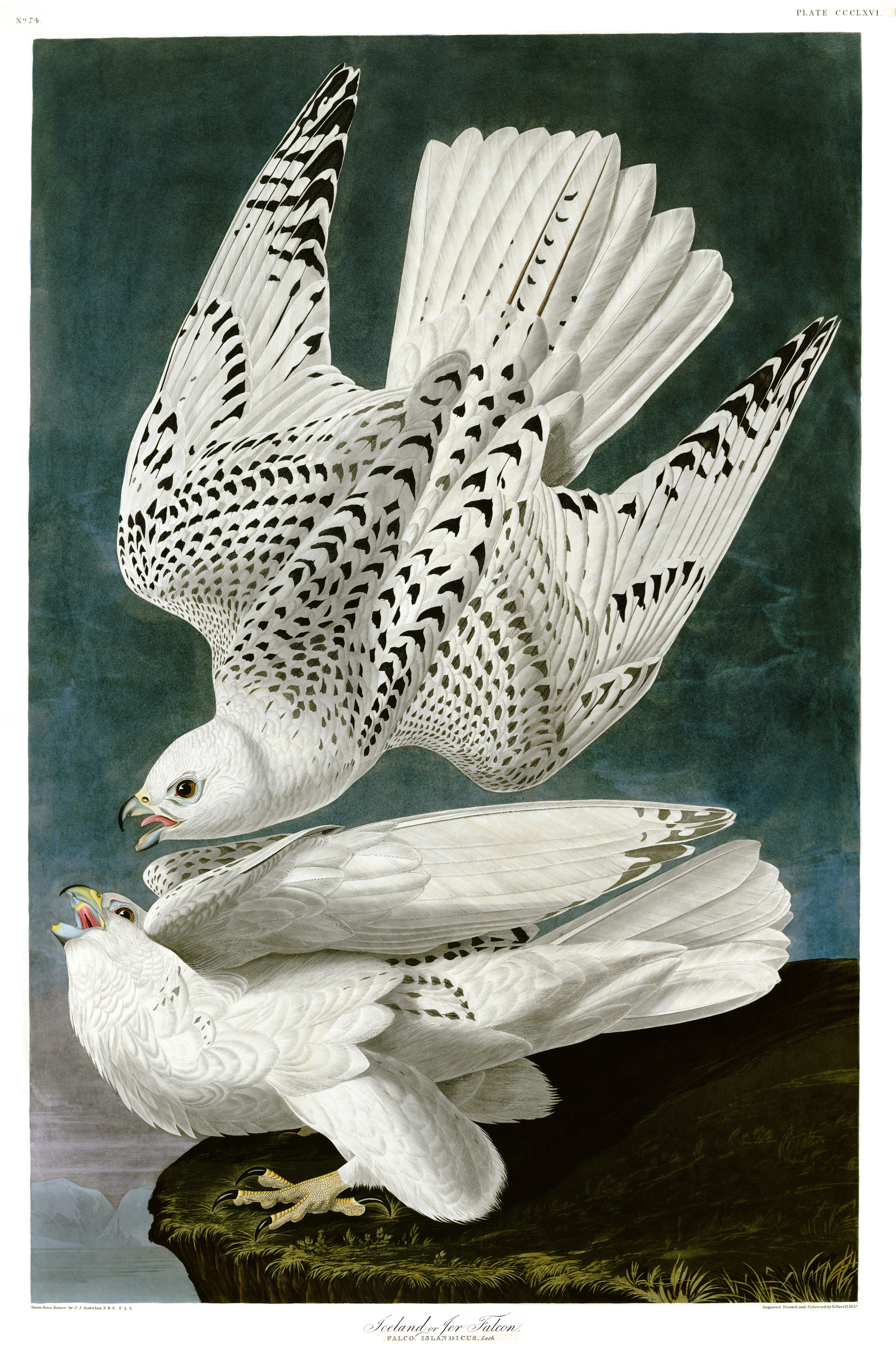
Painting of a pair of white gyrfalcons by John James Audubon

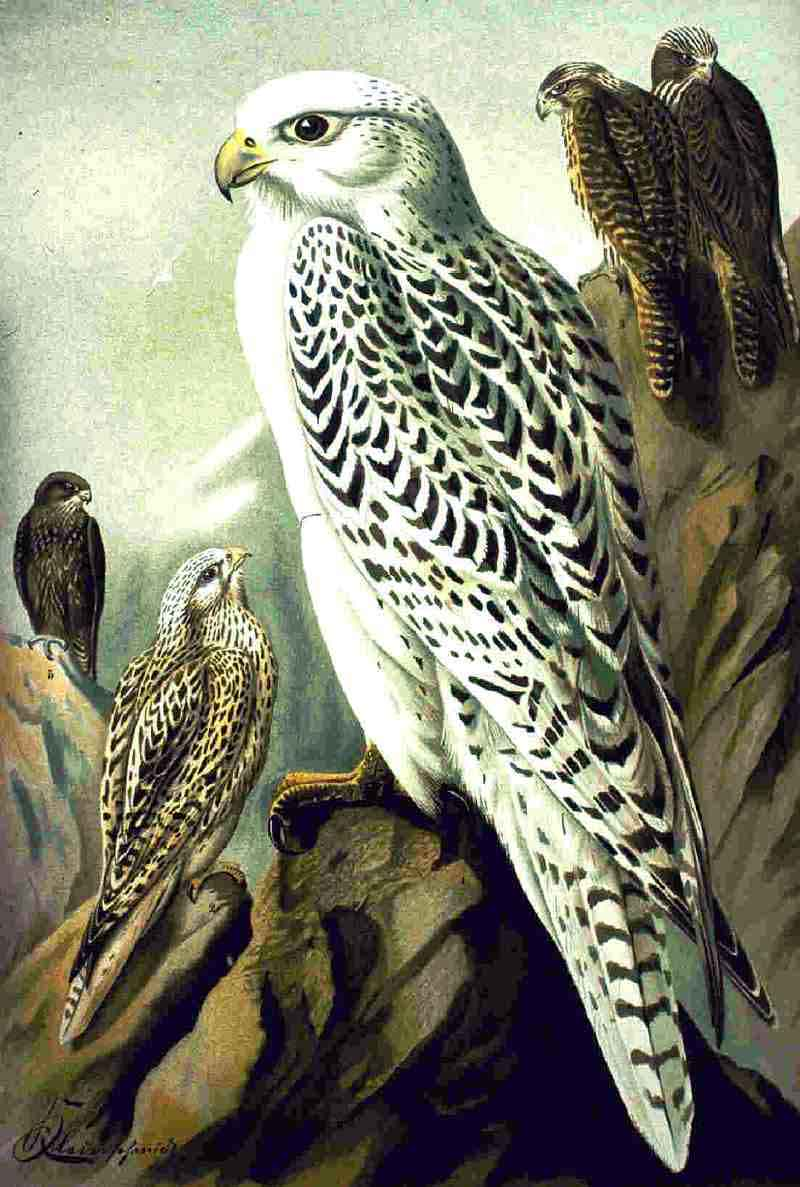
Painting of a Greenland white morph (center), an intermediate (lower left), and black morph (back)

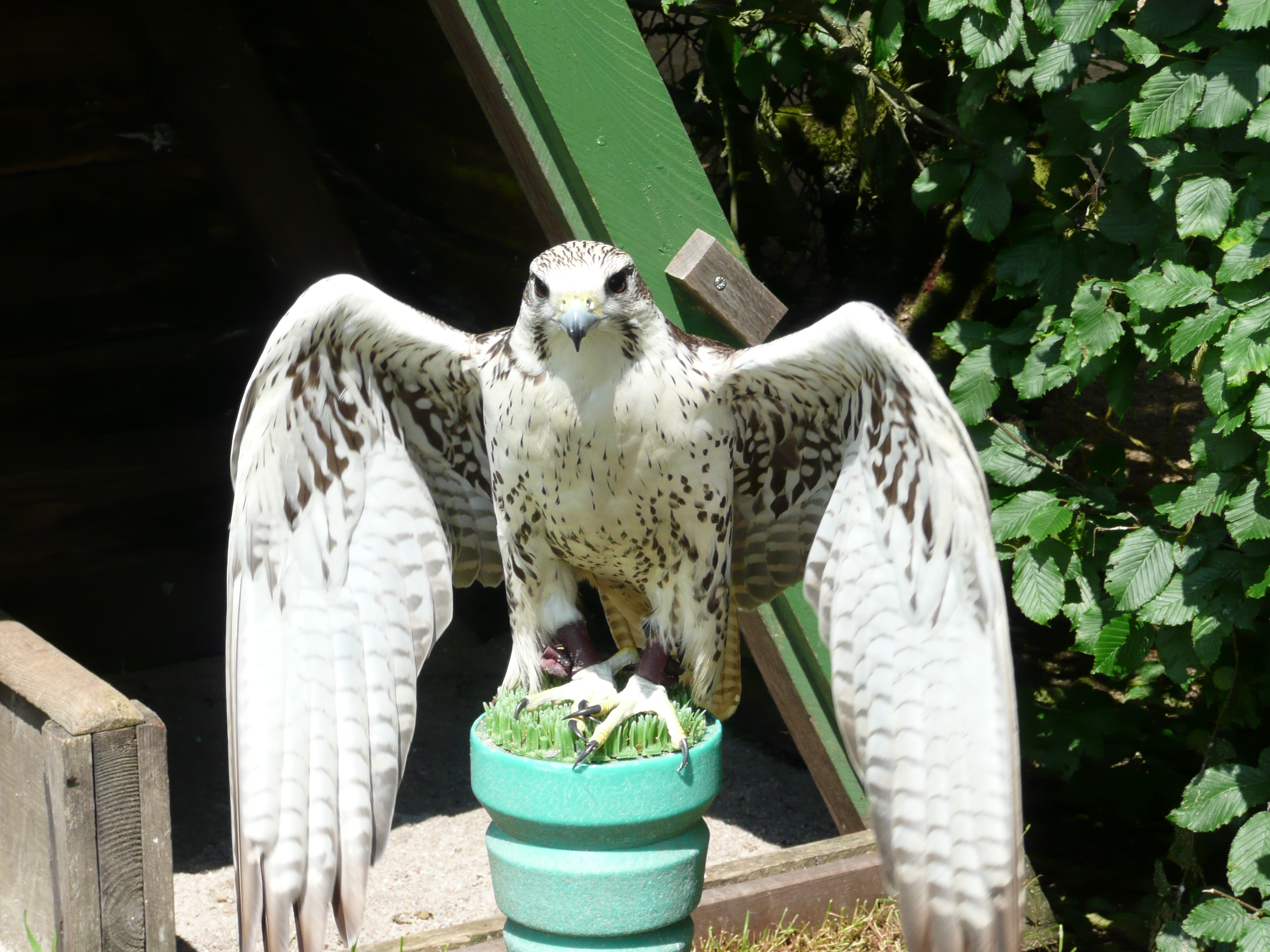
Light silver-morph

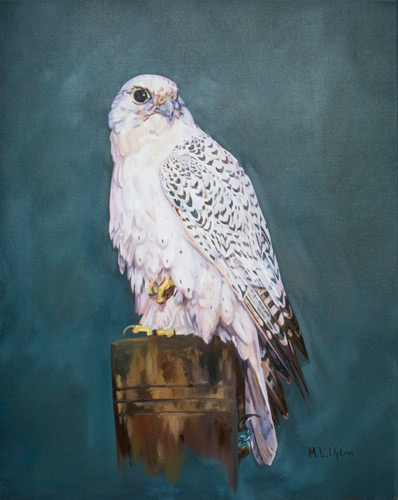
A white gyrfalcon

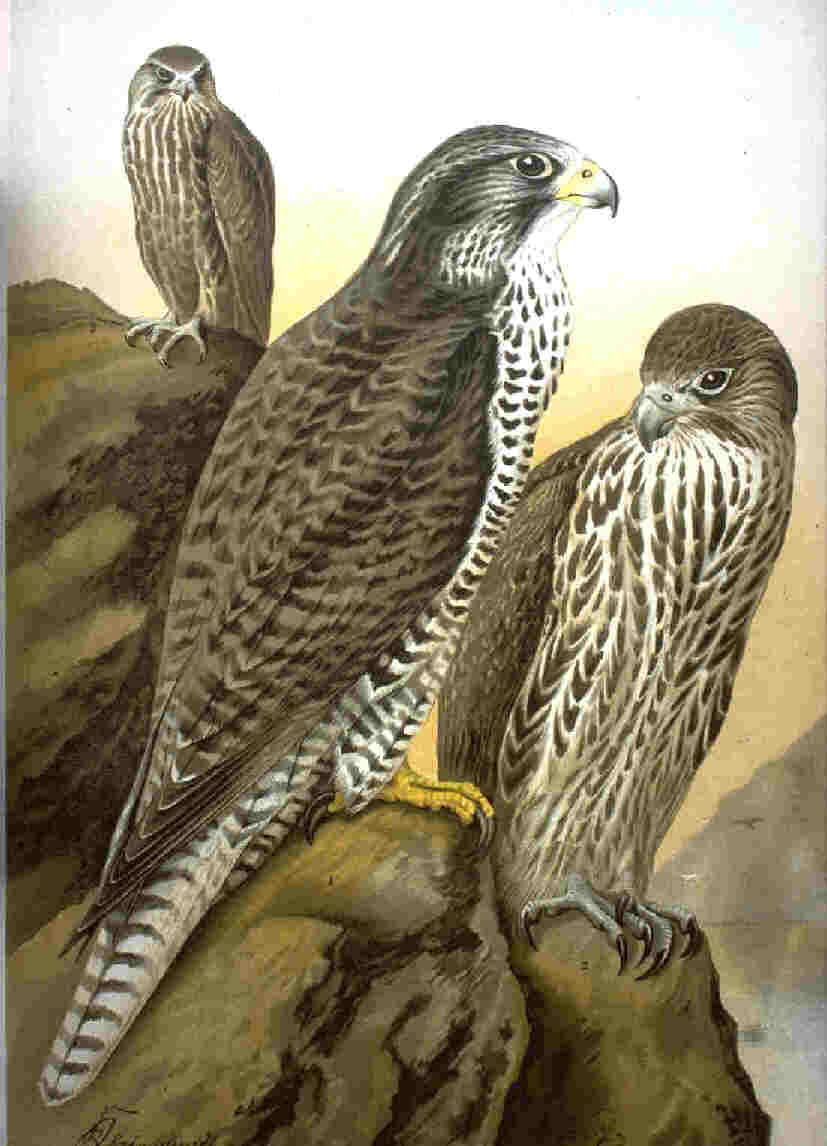
Painting of brown morph adult (center) and juveniles

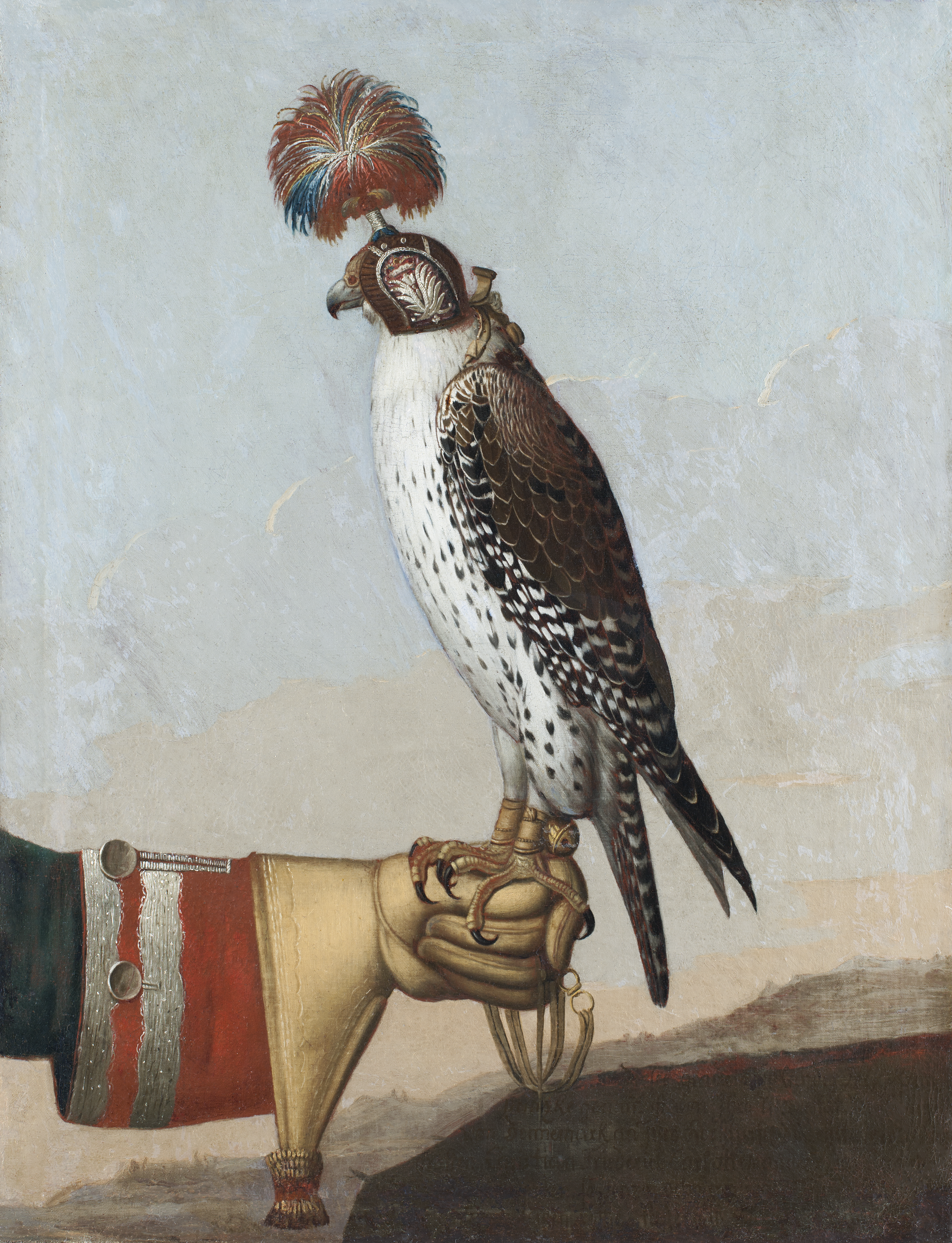
Icelandic gyrfalcon, 1759

== Systematics and evolution ==
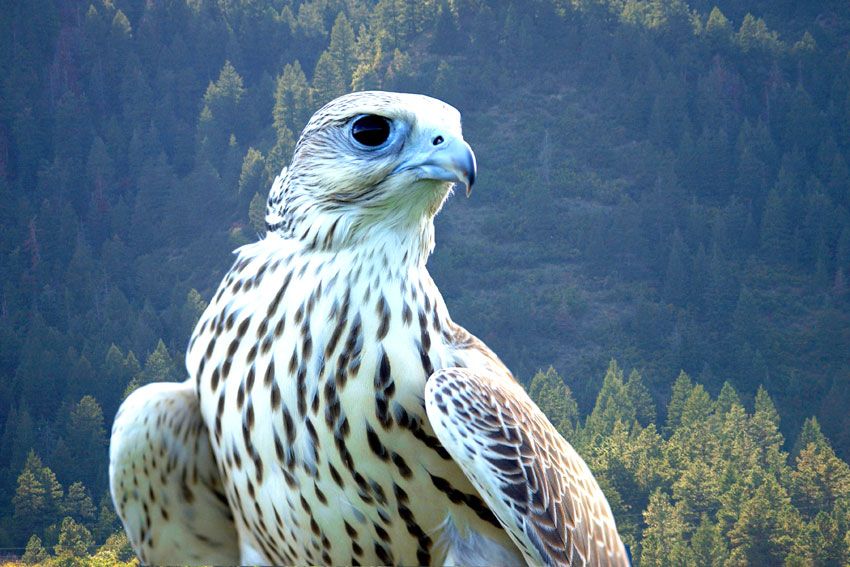
Hybrid white gyrfalcon × saker

The gyrfalcon is a member of the hierofalcon complex. In this group, ample evidence indicates hybridisation and incomplete lineage sorting, which confounds analyses of DNA sequence data to a massive extent. The radiation of the entire living diversity of hierofalcons took place around the Eemian Stage at the start of the Late Pleistocene. It represents lineages that expanded into the Holarctic and adapted to local conditions; this is in contrast to less northerly populations of northeastern Africa (where the radiation probably originated) that evolved into the saker falcon. Previous beliefs held that gyrfalcons hybridized with sakers in the Altai Mountains, and this gene flow contributed to the genetic lineage of the Altai falcon. However, research into falcon genetics published in 2023 has not found distinct genetic clusters differentiating Altai falcons from eastern saker falcons (Falco cherrug milvipes), nor evidence supporting the hybridization theory. Instead, this research suggests that gyrfalcons may have evolved from eastern saker falcons, explaining their close genetic relationship.

Some correlation exists between locality and colour morph. Greenland gyrfalcons are lightest, with white plumage flecked with grey on the back and wings being most common. Other subpopulations have varying amounts of the darker morphs: the Icelandic birds tend towards pale, whereas the Eurasian populations are considerably darker and typically incorporate no white birds. Natural separation into regional subspecies is prevented by gyrfalcons' habit of flying long distances whilst exchanging alleles between subpopulations; thus, the allele distributions for the colour polymorphism form clines and in darker birds (Note: The allele combination producing the white morph seems to be recessive.) of unknown origin, theoretically any allele combination might be present. For instance, a mating of a pair of captive gyrfalcons is documented to have produced a clutch of four young: one white, one silver, one brown, and one black. Molecular work suggests plumage colour is associated with the melanocortin 1 receptor gene (MC1R), where a nonsynonymous point substitution was perfectly associated with the white/melanic polymorphism.

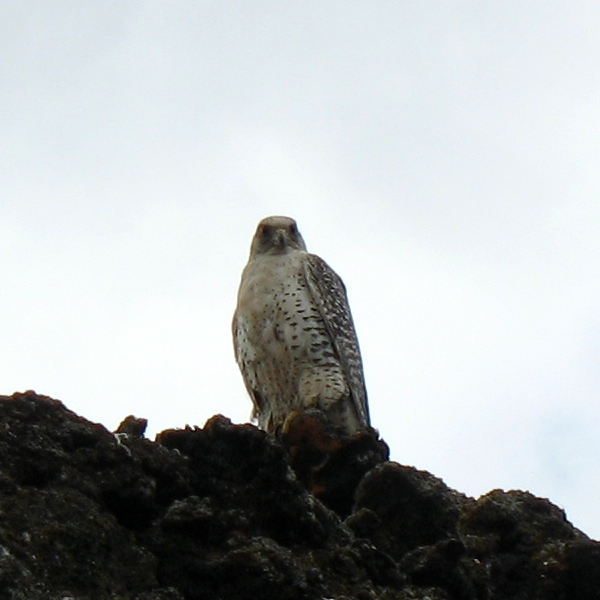
Adult F. r. islandus at Dimmuborgir near Lake Mývatn (Iceland)

In general, geographic variation follows Bergmann's rule for size and the demands of crypsis for plumage coloration. Several subspecies have been named according to perceived differences between populations (Note: Falco rusticolus candicans from northern Greenland and adjacent North America, which is often very white, F. r. obsoletus from the southern Greenland into subarctic North America is much darker, often brown or black, F. r. islandus (Iceland), F. r. rusticolus (Scandinavia including the species' type locality, Sweden), as well as F. r. intermedius and F. r. grebnitzkii (Siberia) all tend towards more or less dark "silver" coloration.) but none of these are consistent and thus no living subspecies are currently accepted. The Icelandic population described as F. r. islandus is perhaps the most distinct. The predominantly white Arctic forms are parapatric and seamlessly grade into the subarctic populations. The Icelandic types are presumed to have less gene flow with their neighbours; they show less variation in plumage colours. Comprehensive phylogeographic studies to determine the proper status of the Icelandic population have yet to be performed.

A population genetic study, however, identified the Iceland population as genetically unique relative to other sampled populations in both eastern and western Greenland, Canada, Alaska, and Norway. Further, within Greenland, differing levels of gene flow between western and eastern sampling locations were identified, with apparent asymmetric dispersal in western Greenland from north to south. This dispersal bias is in agreement with the distribution of plumage colour variants with white gyrfalcons in much higher proportion in north Greenland. Although further work is required to determine the ecological factors contributing to these distributions relative to plumage differences, a study using demographic data suggested that plumage colour distribution in Greenland may be influenced by nesting chronology with white individuals and pairs laying eggs earlier in the breeding season and producing more offspring.

=== Swarth's gyrfalcon ===
A paleosubspecies, Falco rusticolus swarthi, existed during the Late Pleistocene (125,000 to 13,000 years ago). Fossils found in Little Box Elder Cave (Converse County, Wyoming), Dark Canyon Cave (Eddy County, New Mexico), and McKittrick, California were initially described as Falco swarthi ("Swarth falcon" or more properly "Swarth's gyrfalcon") on account of their distinct size. They have meanwhile proven to be largely inseparable from those of living gyrfalcons, except for being somewhat larger.

Swarth's gyrfalcon was on the upper end of the present gyrfalcon's size range, with some stronger females even surpassing it. It seems to have had some adaptations to the temperate semiarid climate that predominated in its range during the last ice age. Ecologically more similar to current Siberian populations (which are generally composed of smaller birds) or to the prairie falcon, this temperate steppe population must have preyed on landbirds and mammals rather than the sea and landbirds which make up much of the American gyrfalcon's diet today.

== Ecology ==
=== Dietary biology ===
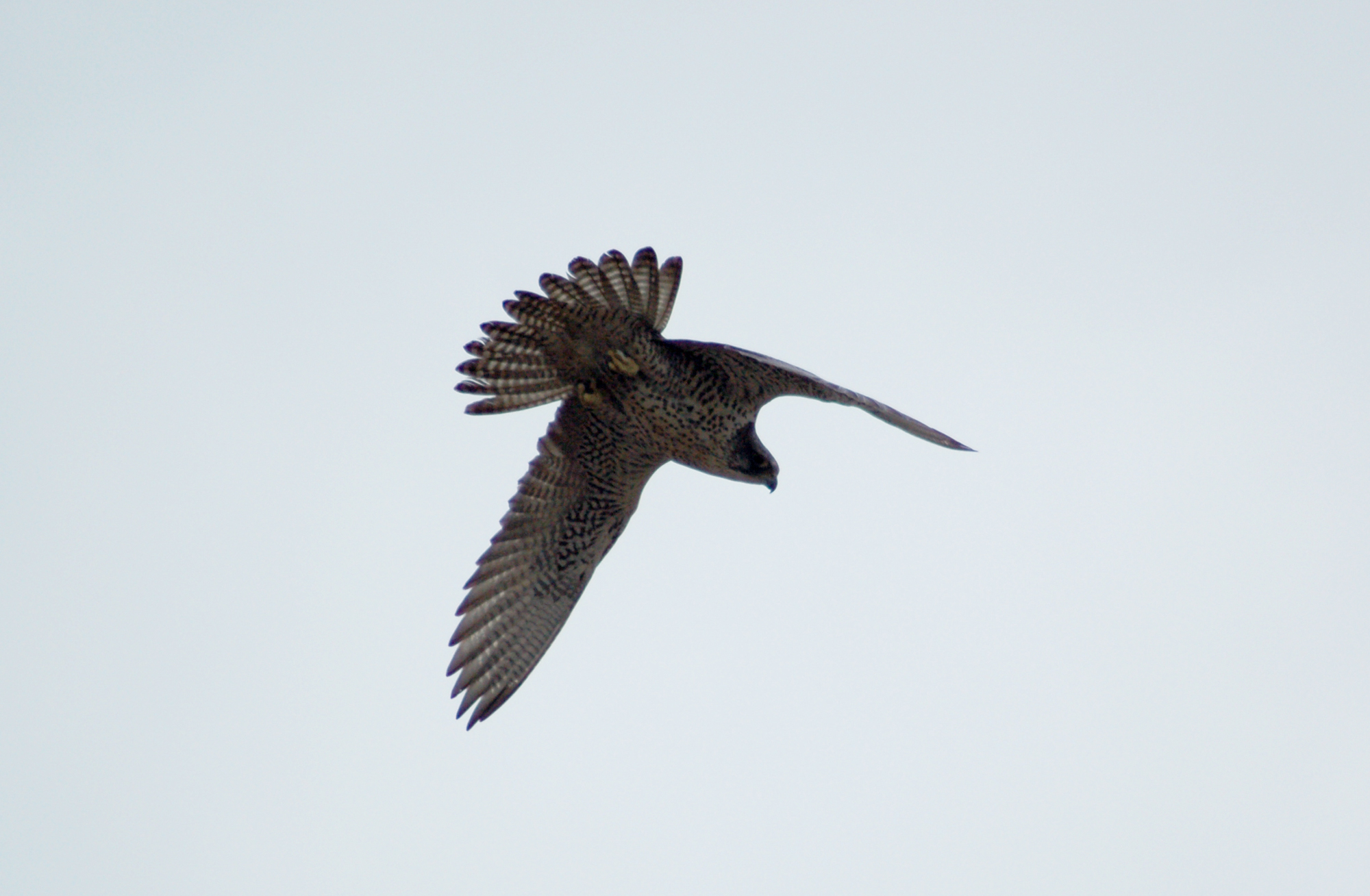
Gyrfalcon in flight (Hastings, MN)

The gyrfalcon was originally thought to be a bird of tundra and mountains only; however, in June 2011, it was revealed to spend considerable periods during the winter on sea ice far from land. It feeds only on birds and mammals, the latter of which it takes more regularly than many other Falco species. Like other hierofalcons, it usually hunts in a horizontal pursuit, rather than with the peregrine's speedy stoop from a height. Most prey is killed on the ground, whether they are captured there, or if the victim is a flying bird, forced to the ground. The diet is to some extent opportunistic, but a majority breed and hunt coinciding with ptarmigan and seabird colonies. Avian prey can range in size from redpolls around 20 g (0.71 oz) to geese and capercaillie up to 4 kg (8.8 lb) in weight, but rock ptarmigan (Lagopus mutus) and willow grouse (L. lagopus) are often chief prey in the tundra. Seabirds such as auks, gulls and seaducks may predominate in coastal areas, and waders and ducks such as mallards (Anas platyrhynchos) on wetlands. Other avian prey include corvids, smaller passerines, doves, and other birds of prey.

Mammalian prey can be locally important, mainly Arctic ground squirrels (Spermophilus parryii) and Arctic hares (Lepus arcticus), and occasionally Norway lemming (Lemmus lemmus) in peak years. Due to the limit of load that they can carry, gyrfalcons mainly take young hares, but both male and female falcons can take down adult hares up 4.5 kg (9.9 lb) in weight and bring dismembered pieces to their nest. Other mammalian prey can include mice, water voles, muskrats, stoats, minks, Arctic fox pups, and rarely also bats. Prey other than birds and mammals are extremely rare, but brown trout (Salmo trutta) have been recorded as prey.

=== Threat from climate change ===
In the early 2000s, it was observed that as possible climate change began to temper the Arctic summers, peregrine falcons were expanding their range north to parts of Greenland, and competing with gyrfalcons. Although it is specially adapted for high-Arctic life, and larger than the peregrine, the gyrfalcon is less aggressive and more conflict-averse, and so is less able to compete with peregrines, which can attack and overwhelm the gyrs. However, it remains on the IUCN's Red List with a Conservation Status of Least Concern.

== Breeding ==
The gyrfalcon almost invariably nests on cliff faces. Breeding pairs do not build their own nests, and often use a bare cliff ledge or the abandoned nest of other birds, particularly golden eagles and common ravens. The clutch can range from 1 to 5 eggs, but is usually 2 to 4. The average size of an egg is 58.46 mm × 45 mm (2 1/4 in × 1 3/4 in); the average weight is 62 g (2 1/8 oz). The incubation period averages 35 days, with the chicks hatching at a weight of around 52 g (1 7/8 oz). The nestlings are brooded usually for 10 to 15 days and leave the nest at 7 to 8 weeks. At 3 to 4 months of age, the immature gyrfalcons become independent of their parents, though they may associate with their siblings through the following winter.

The only natural predators of gyrfalcons are golden eagles, and even they rarely engage with these formidable falcons. Gyrfalcons have been recorded as aggressively harassing animals that come near their nests, although common ravens are the only predators known to successfully pick off gyrfalcon eggs and hatchlings. Even brown bears have been reportedly dive-bombed. Humans, whether accidentally (automobile collisions or poisoning of carrion to kill mammalian scavengers) or intentionally (through hunting), are the leading cause of death for gyrfalcons. Gyrfalcons that survive into adulthood can live up to 20 years of age.

As F. rusticolus has such a wide range, it is not considered a threatened species by the IUCN. It is not much affected by habitat destruction, but pollution, for instance by pesticides, depressed its numbers in the mid-20th century, and until 1994 it was considered "Near Threatened". Improving environmental standards in developed countries have allowed the birds to make a comeback.

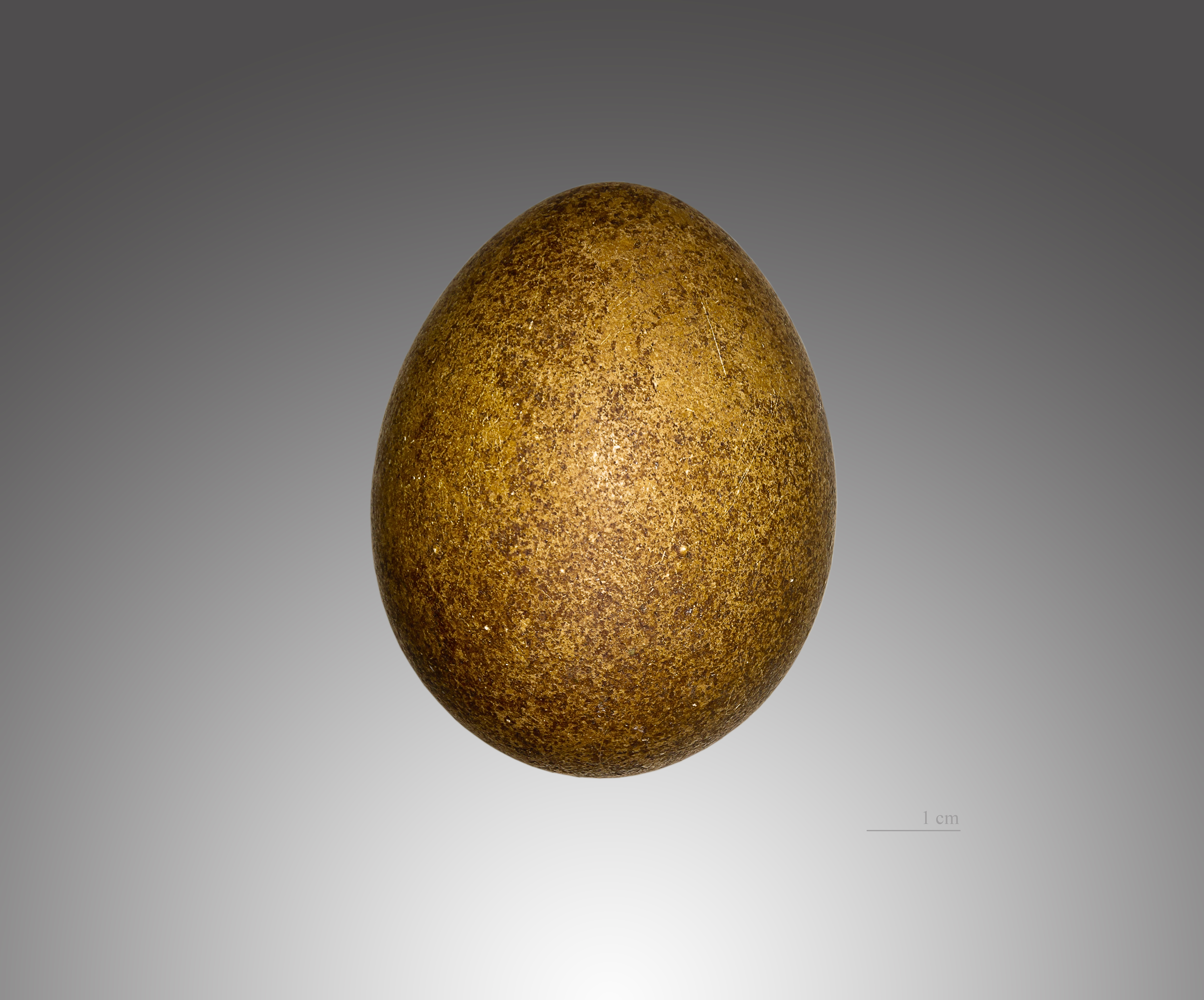
Gyrfalcon (Falco rusticolus) egg

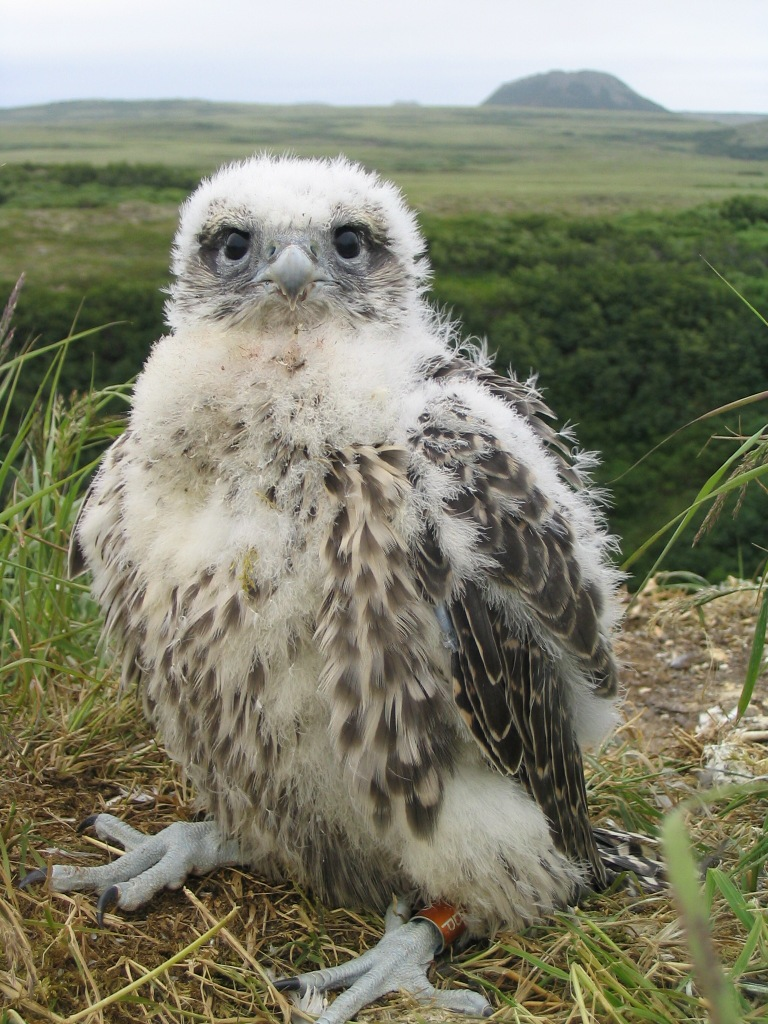
Nestling in Alaska

== Interaction with humans ==
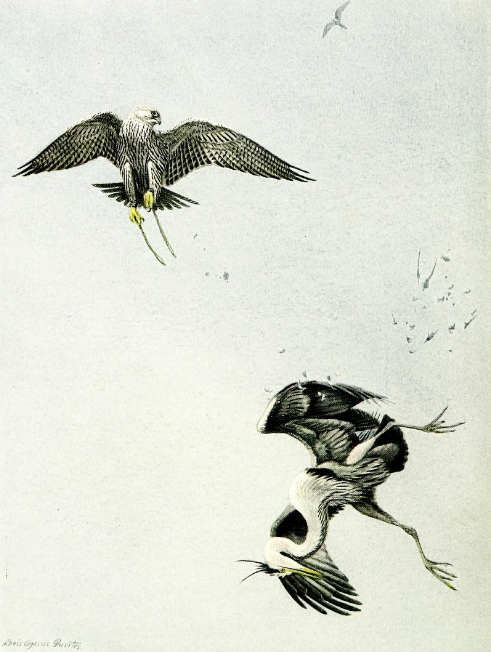
A tamed gyrfalcon striking a wild grey heron (1920), Louis Agassiz Fuertes

The gyrfalcon has long associated with humans, primarily for hunting and in the art of falconry. It is the official bird of Canada's Northwest Territories. The white falcon in the crest of the Icelandic Republic's coat of arms is a variety of gyrfalcon. The white phase gyrfalcon is the official mascot of the United States Air Force Academy.

There is evidence of the taming of gyrfalcons in Scandinavia from the seventh century onwards. The appearance of large numbers in records of gifts to Baghdadi caliphs in the late ninth century suggests that they were important trade commodities for Scandinavian merchants; the influx of white gyrfalcons in Baghdad at this time suggests that the settlement of Iceland in the 870s boosted supply. The geographer and historian Ibn Sa'id al-Maghribi (d. 1286) described certain northern Atlantic islands west of Ireland where these falcons would be brought from, and how the Egyptian Sultan paid 1,000 dinars for each gyrfalcon (or, if it arrived dead, 500 dinars). Due to its rarity and the difficulties involved in obtaining it, in European falconry the gyrfalcon was reserved for kings and nobles; very rarely was a man of lesser rank seen with a gyrfalcon on his fist.

In the 12th century AD Northeast Asia, swan-hunting with gyrfalcons (Šongkoro in Manchu) obtained from the Jurchen tribes became fashionable among the Khitan nobility. When demand for gyrfalcons exceeded supply, the Liao Emperor imposed a tax payment-in-kind of gyrfalcons on the Jurchen; under the last Liao emperor, tax collectors were entitled to use force to procure sufficient gyrfalcons. This was one cause of the Jurchen rebellion, whose leader Aguda annihilated the Liao empire in 1125, and established the Jurchen Jin dynasty in its stead.

Falcons are known to be very susceptible to avian influenza. Therefore, an experiment was done with hybrid gyr-saker falcons, which found that five falcons vaccinated with a commercial H5N2 influenza vaccine survived infection with a highly pathogenic H5N1 strain, whereas five unvaccinated falcons died. Thus, both wild and captive gyrfalcons can be protected from bird flu by vaccination.
