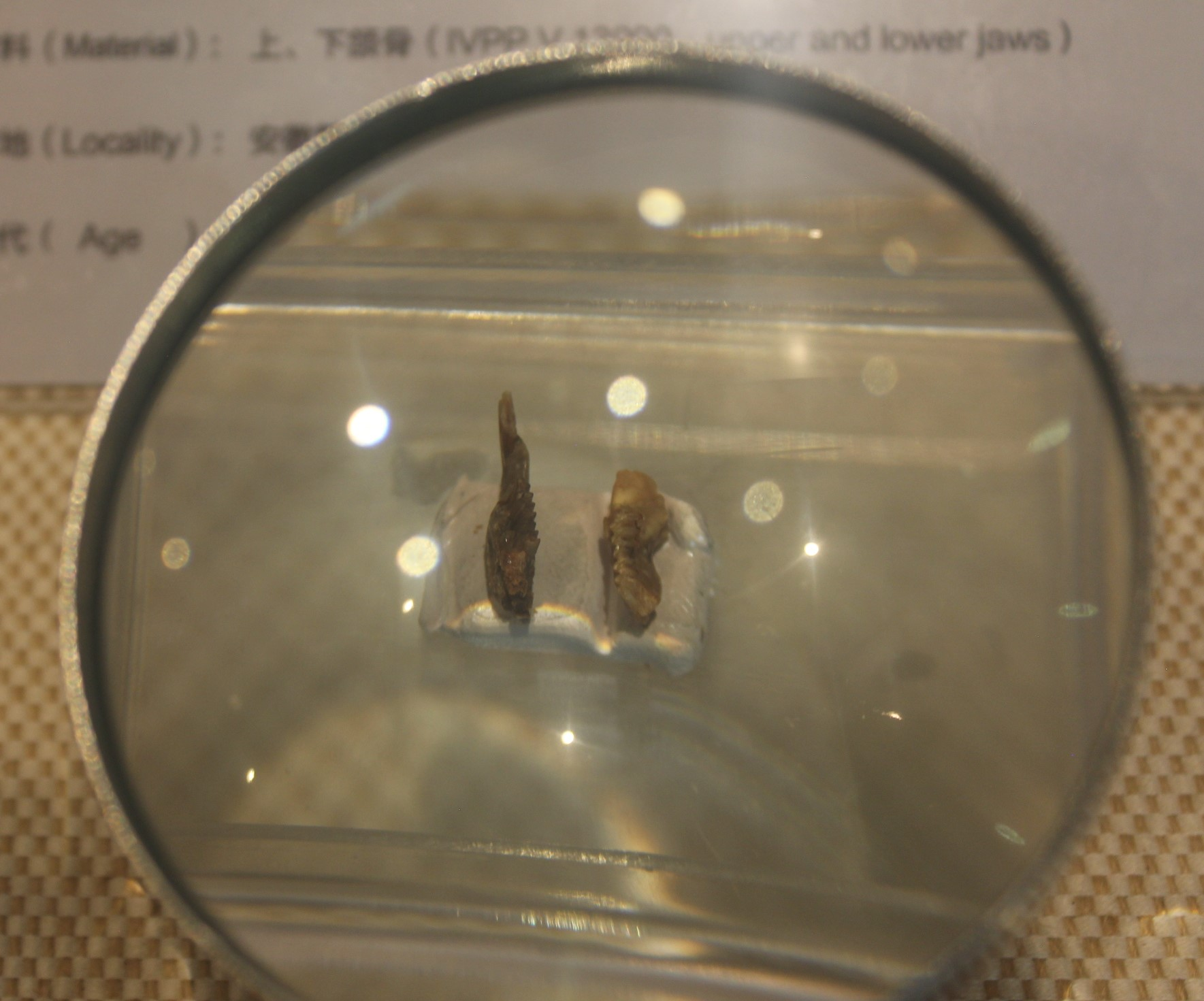
- Fossil jaws (IVPP V13990) of M. gansunicus, Paleozoological Museum of China

Scientific classification
- Kingdom: Animalia
- Phylum: Chordata
- Class: Mammalia
- Infraclass: Placentalia
- Order: Rodentia
- Family: Cricetidae
- Subfamily: Arvicolinae
- Tribe: Arvicolini
- Genus: †Mimomys; Forsyth-Major, 1902

= Mimomys =

Mimomys Temporal range: Pliocene - Pleistocene, 5.3–.05 Ma

Extinct genus of vole

Mimomys is an extinct genus of voles that lived in Eurasia and North America during the Plio-Pleistocene. It is believed that one of the many species belonging to this genus gave rise to the modern water voles (Arvicola). Several other prehistoric genera of vole are probably synonymous with Mimomys, including the North American Cosomys and Ophiomys.

Several species are known to have survived into the Late Pleistocene, including M. pyrenaicus of France and M. chandolensis of the Russian Far East, which may have survived as recently as 50,000 BP.
