= Watering hole (disambiguation) =

A watering hole is a geologic depression in which water collects and where animals come to drink.

Watering hole may also refer to:

- A tavern, bar, pub, or other local drinking establishment
- Watering hole attack, a computer attack strategy that targets a website (the "watering hole") where intended victims congregate

== See also ==
- Water hole (disambiguation)
- Water well, an excavated hole that is dug to provide water
- Water gate, a fortified gate to allow water into a fortification
- Destination spa, a resort facility for 'taking the waters'
- Bar (disambiguation)
- Pub (disambiguation)
