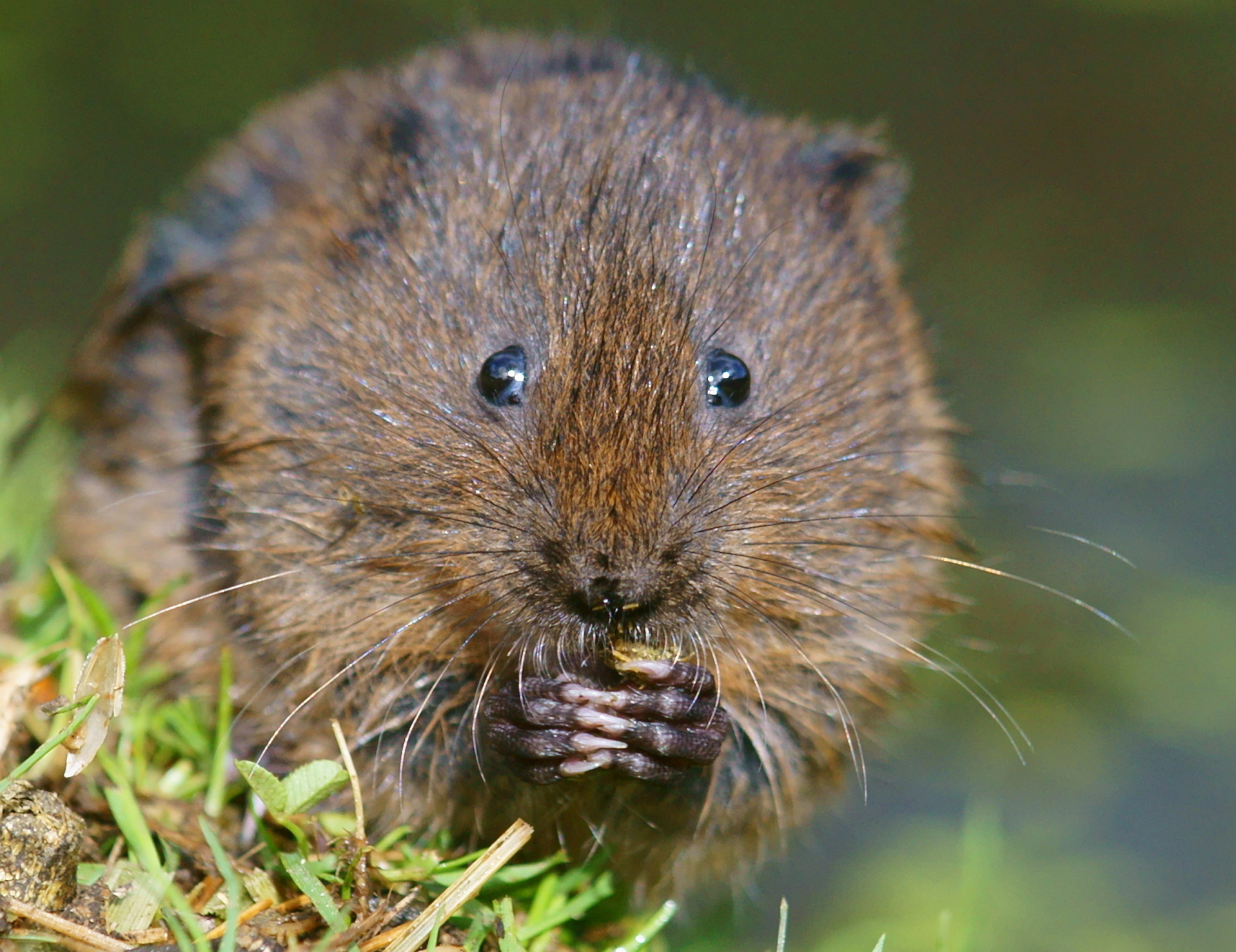

Conservation status
- Least Concern (IUCN 3.1)

Scientific classification
- Kingdom: Animalia
- Phylum: Chordata
- Class: Mammalia
- Order: Rodentia
- Family: Cricetidae
- Subfamily: Arvicolinae
- Genus: Arvicola
- Species: A. scherman

Binomial name
- Arvicola scherman Shaw, 1801
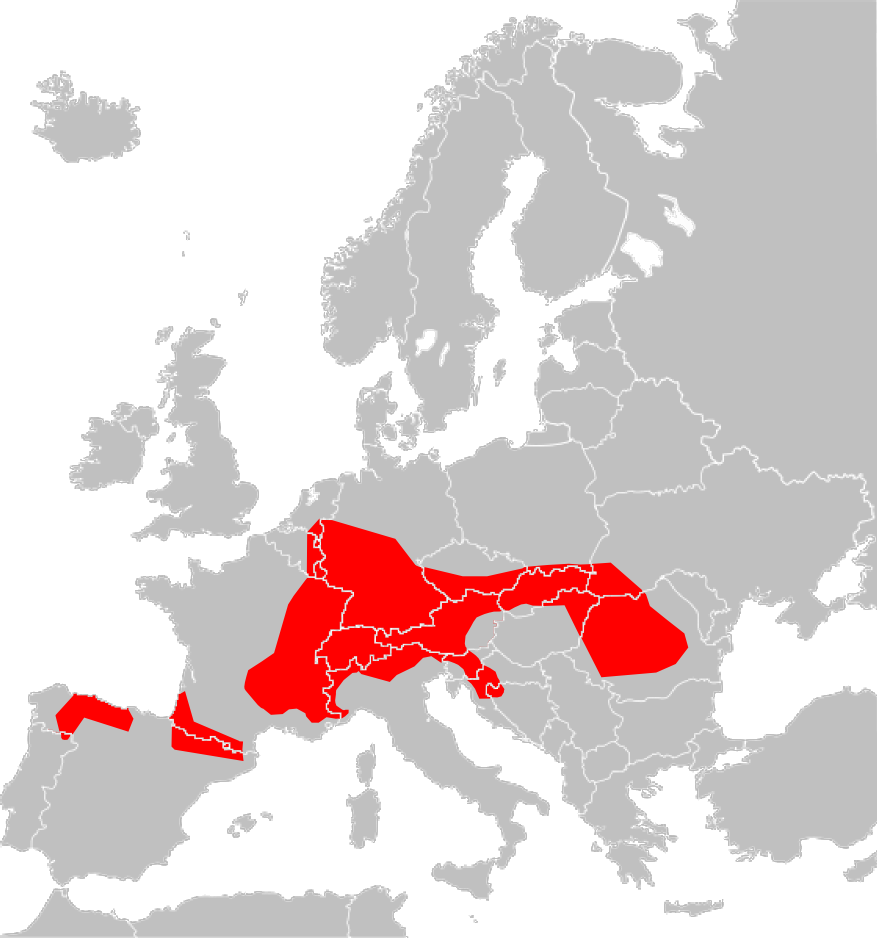

= Montane water vole =

Species of rodent

The montane water vole (Arvicola scherman) is a fossorial species of vole found throughout Central and Western Europe, northern Spain, and central Romania, particularly in high-altitude mountain regions such as the Alps, Pyrenees, and Carpathians. Arvicola scherman was initially regarded as a subspecies of Arvicola terrestris but was later redesignated as a species by Panteleyev in 2000. Unlike its close relative, the European water vole (Arvicola amphibius), which is semi-aquatic, the montane water vole has adapted to a burrowing lifestyle in mountainous environments. Genetic and fossil evidence suggest that the Arvicola species originated during the Pleistocene epoch, with the montane water vole diverging due to habitat specialization and geographic isolation. While the American Society of Mammalogists treats A. scherman as a synonym of Arvicola amphibius, genetic studies indicate distinct differences between the two species.

== Taxonomy and classification ==
=== Etymology and caming ===
The species Arvicola Scherman (Shaw, 1801), formerly known as Arvicola terrestris, is considered to be a member of the genus Arvicola along with another closely related species part of water voles that includes the European water vole (Arvicola amphibius). The common name "montane water vole" refers to its preference for mountainous and high-altitude habitats, distinguishing it from its water vole relative.

=== Evolutionary history ===
The montane water vole belongs to the subfamily Arvicolinae that primarily consists of voles, lemmings, and muskrats. Current fossil evidence suggests that Arvicola species originated during the Pleistocene epoch, around 2.5 million years ago to 11,700 years ago, evolving as a result of fluctuating glacial and interglacial periods in Eurasia during that time.

Studies examining the mitochondrial DNA of various water vole species have suggested that the montane water vole species diverged from its close relative, the European water vole, due to differences in habitat preference and ecological pressures. While the European water vole adapted to semi-aquatic environments, like rivers and wetlands, montane water voles diverged towards a more fossorial, or burrowing, lifestyle in higher-altitude habitats. This specialization allowed the species to thrive in montane and subalpine grasslands in Eurasia. Genetic studies suggest modern populations of montane water vole show regional variations, most likely due to past geographic isolation and recolonization of montane habitats.

== Distribution and habitat ==
=== Geographic range ===
The montane water vole is primarily found in Central and Western Europe, with populations distributed across the Alps, Pyrenees, Carpathians, and other mountainous regions. Its range includes countries such as France, Switzerland, Germany, Austria, Romania, Spain, and parts of Eastern Europe. Unlike the closely related European water vole, which is semi-aquatic, montane water voles are a fossorial species, preferring underground burrow systems in upland environments.

=== Preferred habitat ===
Montane water voles are typically found in montane and subalpine meadows, pastures and grasslands, forested slopes, clearing, and agricultural fields. The species is adapted to high-altitude environments and prefers habitats with soft, well-drained soil for burrowing and avoids waterlogged areas suitable for European water voles.

=== Habitat adaptations and ecological role ===
Because of their burrowing nature, montane water voles play a significant role in soil aeration and nutrient cycling. It is known to create complex tunnel systems that can influence plant growth and local microhabitats. While beneficial to ecosystems, its burrowing activities can sometimes conflict with agricultural practices, specifically in grazing lands where it may be considered a pest.

== Research and conservation efforts ==
=== Scientific research ===
The montane water vole has been the subject of various ecological and genetic studies, particularly its burrowing behavior, population dynamics, and evolutionary history. Key areas of research include:

- Genetic diversity and population dynamics — Studies using mitochondrial DNA and microsatellite markers have examined the genetic differentiation among regional populations, highlighting the effects of geographic isolation and habitat fragmentation.
- Burrowing and ecosystem impact – Research has explored the species' fossorial lifestyle influences soil aeration, nutrient cycling, parasite occurrence, and plant distribution in montane grasslands.
- Human-wildlife interactions – Some studies have focused on the vole's impact on agriculture, particularly in grazing lands, where its burrowing activity can disrupt pastures and orchards.

=== Conservation status ===
Currently classified as Least Concern (LC) on the IUCN Red List, as it has widespread distribution across Europe and does not face immediate threats of extinction. However, certain populations may be vulnerable to threats due to habitat loss, pest control measures, and climate change.

== Sources ==
- Musser, G. G.; Carleton, M. D. (2005). "Species Arvicola scherman". In Wilson, D. E.; Reeder, D. M. (eds.). Mammal Species of the World: A Taxonomic and Geographic Reference (3rd ed.). Johns Hopkins University Press. pp. 894–1531. ISBN 978-0-8018-8221-0. OCLC 62265494.
