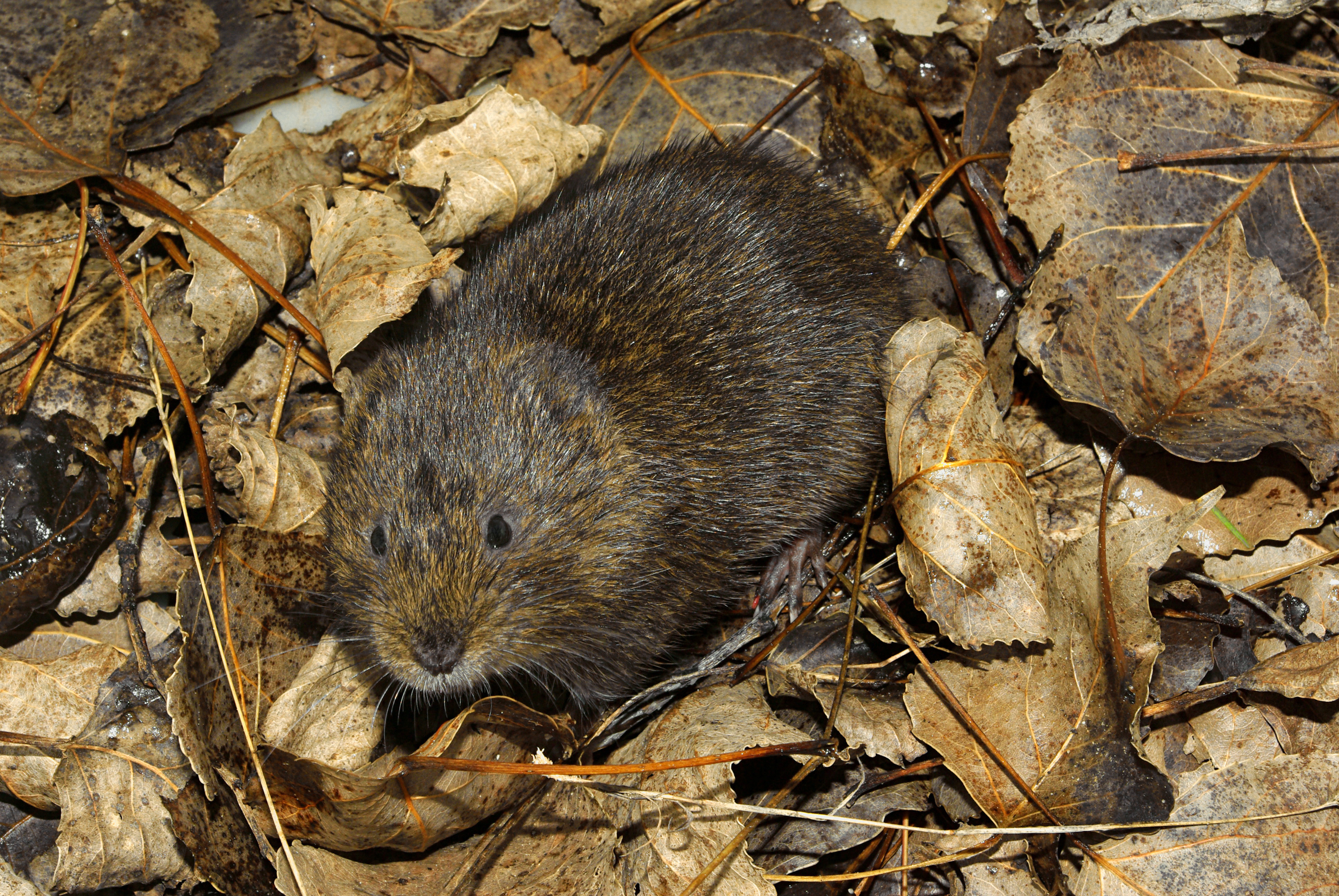

Conservation status
- Near Threatened (IUCN 3.1)

Scientific classification
- Kingdom: Animalia
- Phylum: Chordata
- Class: Mammalia
- Order: Rodentia
- Family: Cricetidae
- Subfamily: Arvicolinae
- Genus: Arvicola
- Species: A. sapidus

Binomial name
- Arvicola sapidus G. S. Miller, 1908
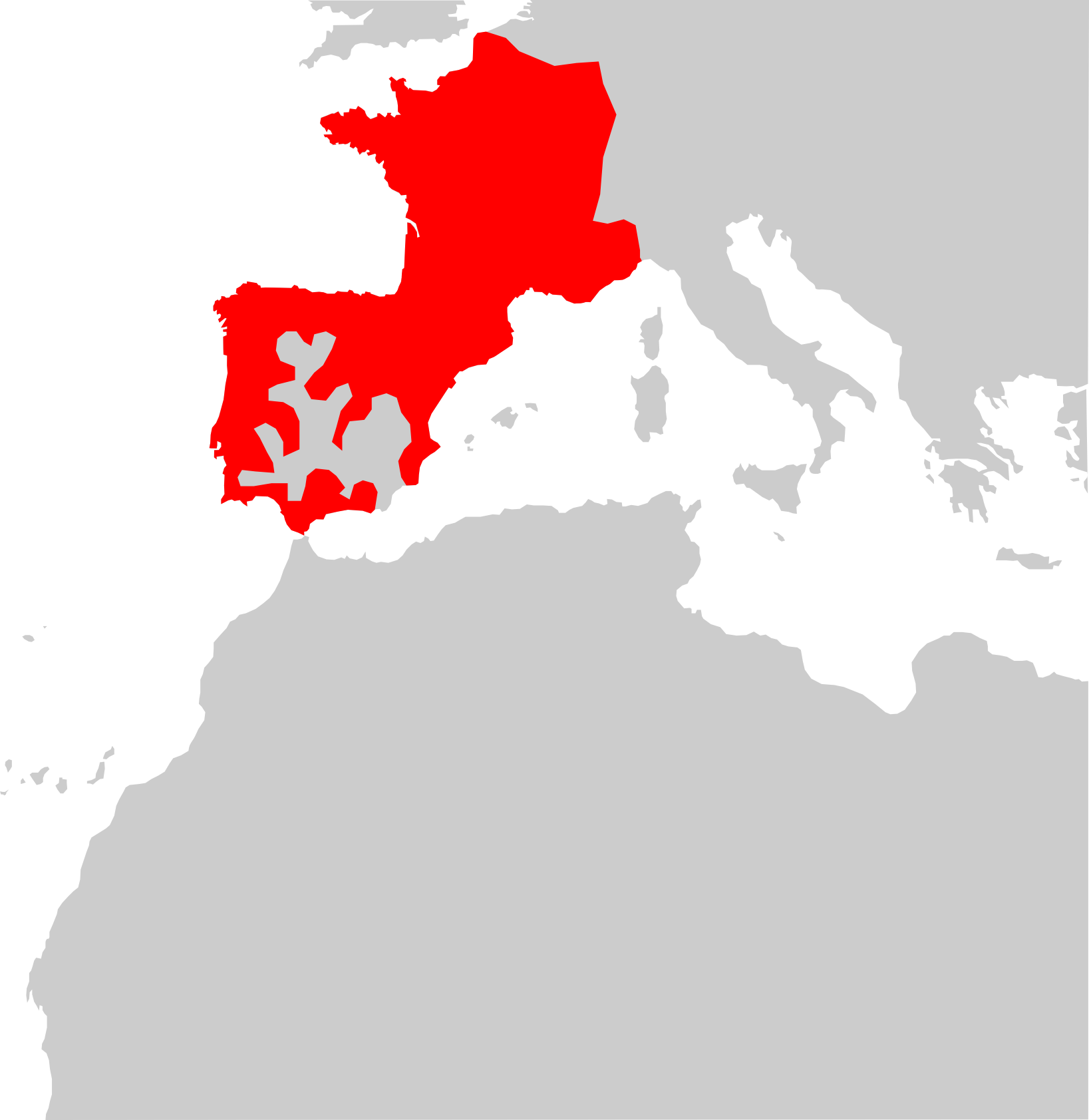
- Range

= Southwestern water vole =

Species of rodent

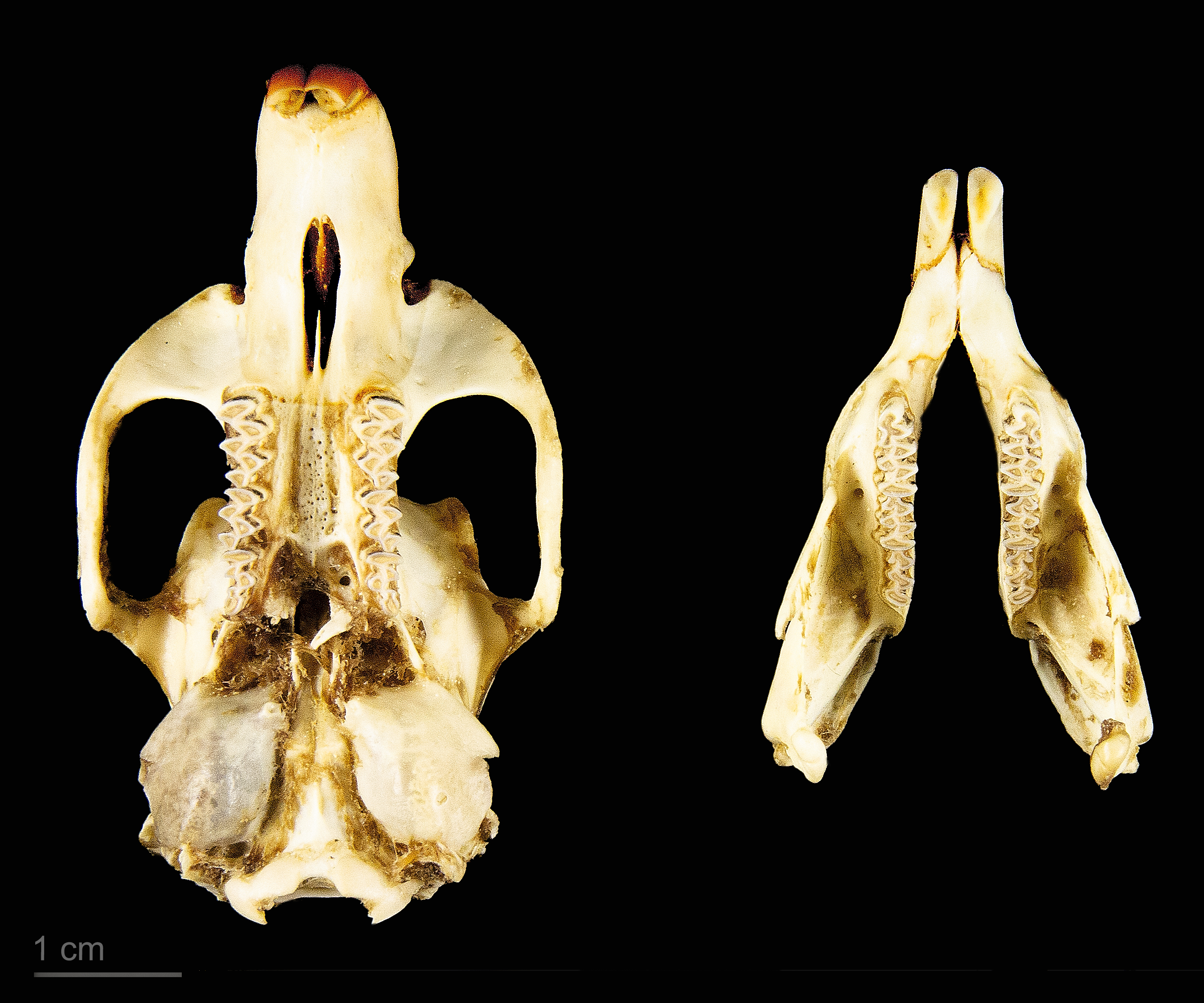
Skull of Arvicola sapidus - MHNT

The southwestern water vole or southern water vole (Arvicola sapidus) is a large amphibious vole native to most of France and southwestwards through Spain and Portugal. It is listed on the IUCN Red List as a Near Threatened species.

== Reproductive cycle ==
The reproductive cycle of the southwestern water vole varies seasonally and geographically, with the most intense reproductive activity occurring from March through October, peaking between April and June. Although reproduction occurs year-round, a distinct reduction in reproductive activity occurs from November through February, coinciding with lower temperatures and shorter day lengths. Females become sexually mature when they reach a weight of around 140 grams (4.9 oz), with larger individuals typically having higher reproductive success.

On average, females produce litters of about four offspring (range 1–7). Litter size is directly correlated with maternal body weight, with heavier females tending to have larger litters. Gestation occurs throughout nearly the entire year, though the frequency varies significantly, with fewer pregnancies observed during the winter months. Intrauterine mortality affects about 5% of embryos and is more common in older females. The reproductive life of adult females may include multiple litters annually, with some individuals potentially having up to six litters over their lifetime. Additionally, females may conceive again soon after giving birth, as evidenced by the simultaneous occurrence of pregnancy and lactation in some individuals. Male reproductive capacity similarly varies seasonally, with testes reaching their largest sizes during spring and summer, and significantly reducing in size during autumn and winter months.

== Habitat, dispersal, and population genetics ==
The southwestern water vole inhabits scattered, specialized habitats, typically associated with small vegetation patches on muddy soil along water bodies, using dense vegetation cover as protection from predators and drought. These habitats constitute less than 2% of their studied region in southern Spain, making their populations naturally fragmented and susceptible to local extinctions. Despite being habitat specialists, southern water voles display relatively generalist dispersal patterns, able to traverse seemingly inhospitable terrain to colonise distant patches of suitable habitat. Genetic studies using microsatellite markers and mitochondrial DNA have demonstrated that gene flow among populations remains relatively high, even between non-adjacent habitat patches, suggesting an adaptation to patchy and unstable habitats through effective long-distance dispersal strategies.

Population genetic analyses revealed moderate genetic diversity, with significant genetic structuring explained predominantly by geographic distances between populations rather than specific landscape features. Field studies show dispersal distances averaging approximately 700 metres (2,300 ft), without significant differences between sexes. These ecological and genetic findings highlight the voles' resilience and adaptability in naturally fragmented landscapes. This contrasts with the closely related European water vole (Arvicola amphibius), whose dispersal behaviour is typically more restricted by landscape features.

== Phylogeography ==
Genetic studies have revealed significant phylogeographic structure within the southwestern water vole population, despite relatively shallow overall mitochondrial divergence. Analyses of mitochondrial control region and cytochrome b sequences across populations in Iberia and France identified a total of 85 distinct haplotypes, indicating high genetic diversity. Seven distinct geographical genetic groups were defined, explaining approximately 44% of the mitochondrial variation observed. This phylogeographic pattern suggests historical fragmentation into subrefugia within the broader Iberian refugium during the Pleistocene ice ages, with subsequent demographic expansions occurring in at least three of these groups.

A genetic distinction exists between Iberian populations and those in France, supporting a scenario where French populations originated from a relatively recent colonisation event from Iberia about 62,000 years ago, prior to the Last Glacial Maximum. French populations have significantly lower genetic diversity than Iberian ones, indicating a founder effect from a limited number of Iberian migrants. Despite these differences, ongoing gene flow between these groups appears limited but consistent, suggesting that the Pyrenees were not an absolute barrier to vole migration.

The observed phylogeographic structure does not align well with previously proposed morphological subspecies distinctions, such as A. sapidus tenebricus in northern Iberia, characterised by darker fur, and A. sapidus sapidus elsewhere. Genetic analyses show no correlation between mitochondrial lineages and these phenotypic differences, suggesting that morphological variations, including coat colour and body size, likely represent local environmental adaptations rather than evidence of historically isolated subspecies. For instance, individuals in Doñana National Park show a consistent reduction in body size and weight, attributed to environmental factors rather than genetic divergence

== Sources ==
- Musser, G. G.; Carleton, M. D. (2005). "Superfamily Muroidea". In Wilson, D. E.; Reeder, D. M. (eds.). Mammal Species of the World: A Taxonomic and Geographic Reference (3rd ed.). Johns Hopkins University Press. pp. 894–1531. ISBN 978-0-8018-8221-0. OCLC 62265494.
