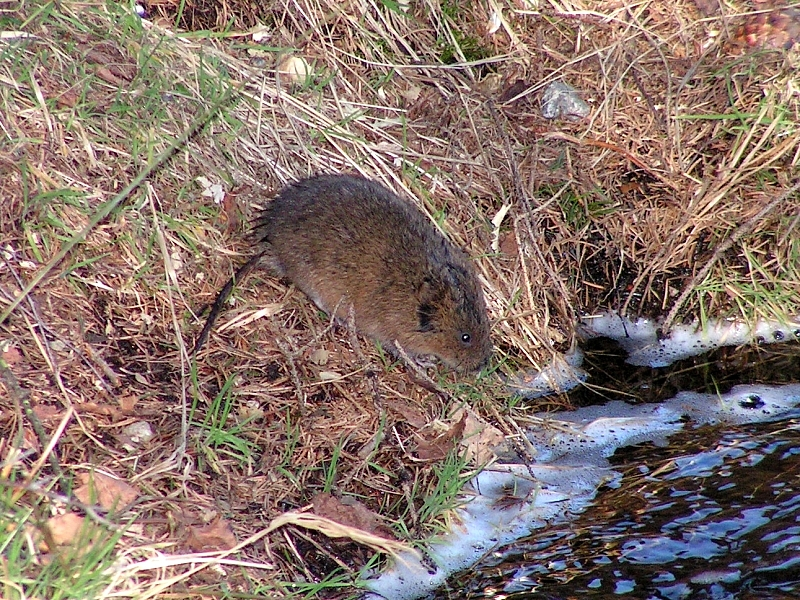
- Arvicola amphibius

Scientific classification
- Kingdom: Animalia
- Phylum: Chordata
- Class: Mammalia
- Order: Rodentia
- Family: Cricetidae
- Subfamily: Arvicolinae
- Tribe: Arvicolini
- Genus: Arvicola; Lacépède, 1799

Type species
- Mus amphibius Linnaeus, 1758

Species
- See text

= Arvicola =

Water voles Temporal range: Early Pleistocene - Recent

Genus of mammals

Water voles are large voles in the genus Arvicola. They are found in both aquatic and dry habitat through Europe and much of northern Asia. A water vole found in Western North America was historically considered a member of this genus, but has been shown to be more closely related to members of the genus Microtus. Head and body lengths are 12–22 cm (4.7–8.7 in), tail lengths are 6.5–12.5 cm (2.6–4.9 in), and their weights are 70–250 g (2.5–8.8 oz). The animals may exhibit indeterminate growth. They are thick-furred and have hairy fringes on their feet that improve their swimming ability.

A 2021 phylogenetic study using mtDNA found that Arvicola may not belong with the rest of its namesake tribe Arvicolini, but rather forms a sister group to the tribe Lagurini.

== Species ==
There are three species as listed by the IUCN:

- European (or northern) water vole (A. amphibius or A. terrestris)
- Southwestern (or southern) water vole (A. sapidus)
- Montane water vole (A. scherman)

The American Society of Mammalogists recognizes four species, with A. italicus and A. persicus being split from A. amphibius, and A. scherman being synonymous with A. amphibius:

- Eurasian water vole (A. amphibius)
- Italian water vole (A. italicus)
- Persian water vole (A. persicus)
- Southwestern water vole (A. sapidus)
