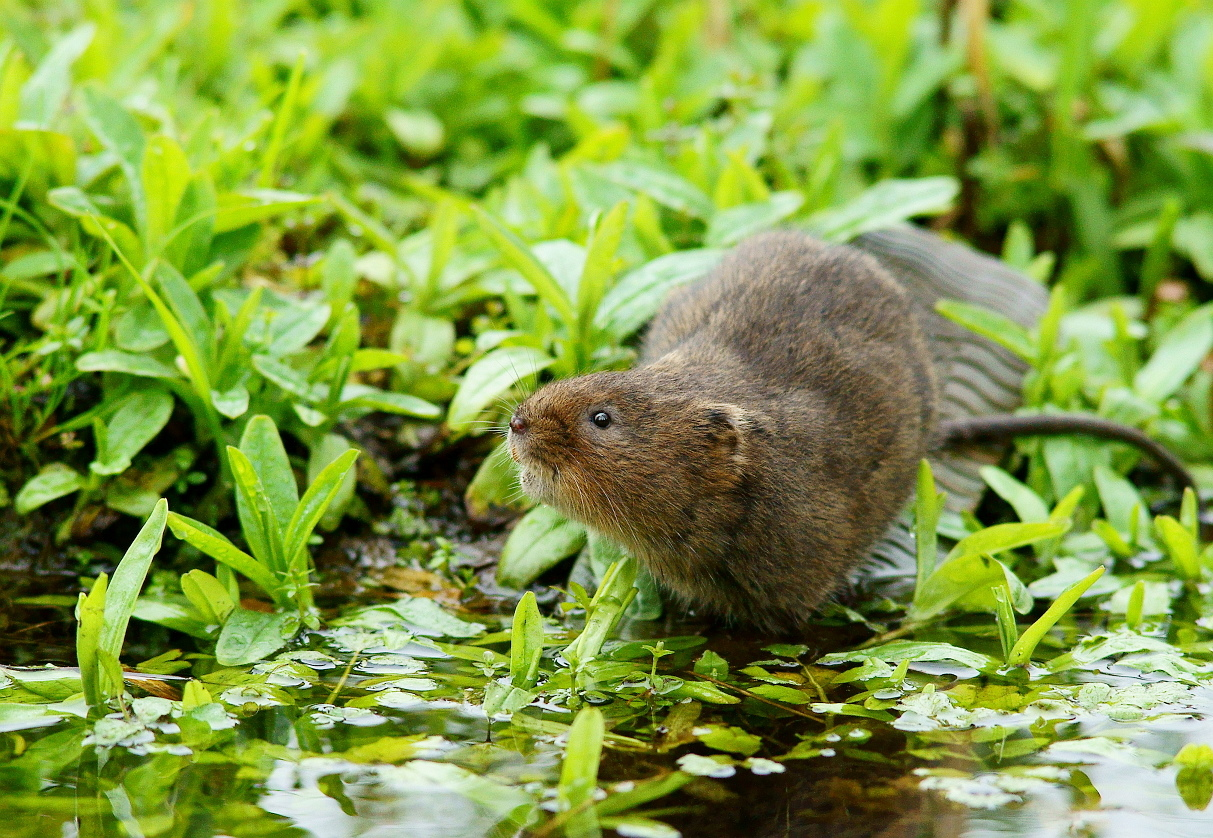

Conservation status
- Least Concern (IUCN 3.1)

Scientific classification
- Kingdom: Animalia
- Phylum: Chordata
- Class: Mammalia
- Order: Rodentia
- Family: Cricetidae
- Subfamily: Arvicolinae
- Genus: Arvicola
- Species: A. amphibius

Binomial name
- Arvicola amphibius (Linnaeus, 1758)
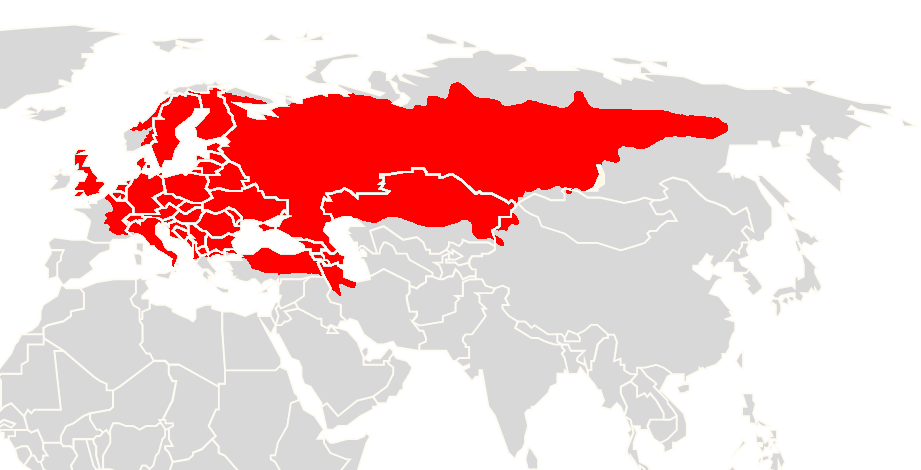

Synonyms
- Arvicola terrestris (Linnaeus, 1758); Mus amphibius Linnaeus, 1758; Mus terrestris Linnaeus, 1758

= European water vole =

Species of rodent

The European water vole (Arvicola amphibius) or northern water vole is a semi-aquatic rodent. It is often informally called the water rat, though it only superficially resembles a true rat. Water voles have rounder noses than rats, deep brown fur, chubby faces, and short fuzzy ears; unlike rats, their tails, paws, and ears are covered with hair.

In the wild, on average, water voles only live about five months. Maximum longevity in captivity is two and a half years.

== Appearance ==
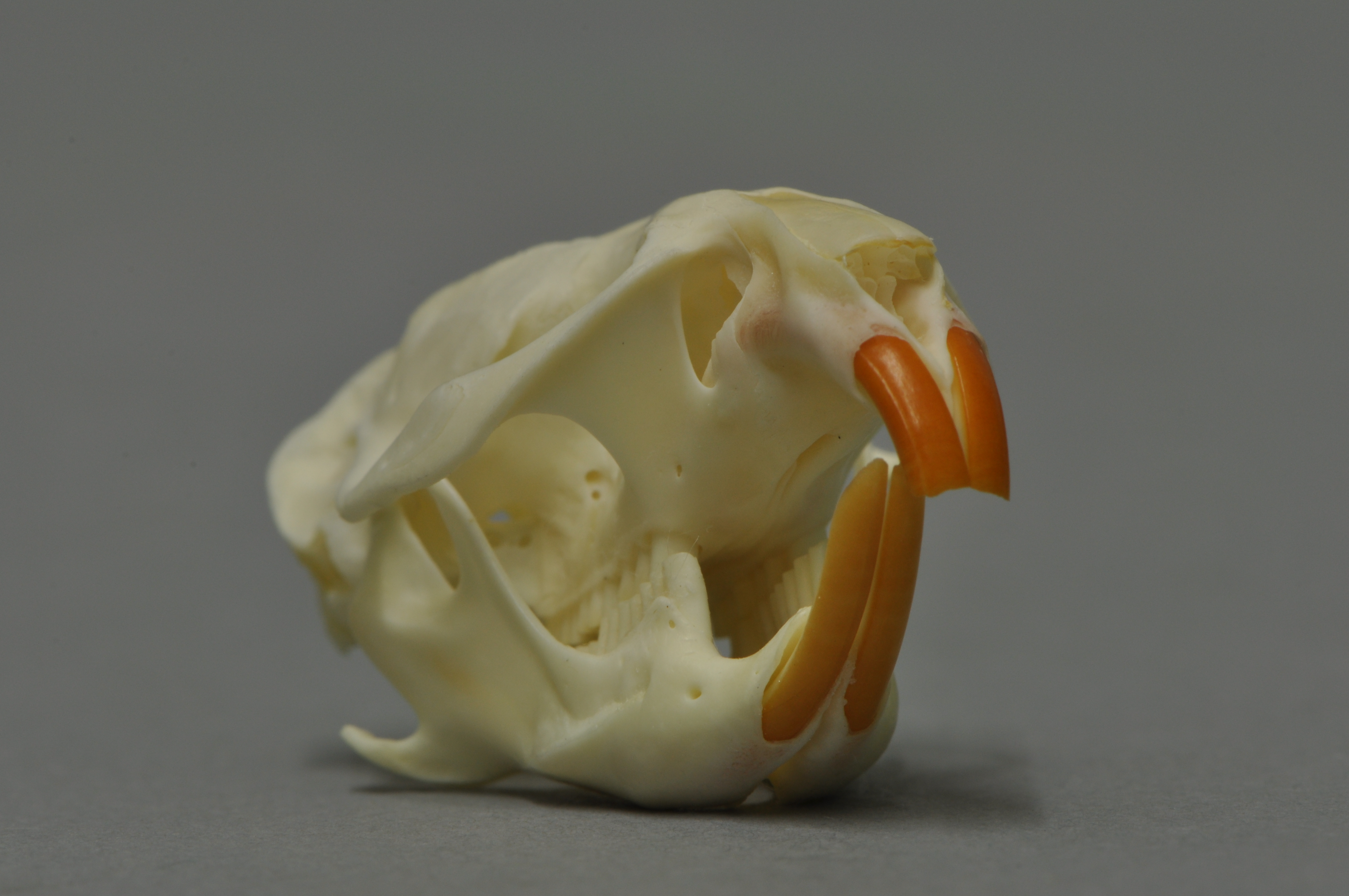
Skull of a European water vole

Natural Resources Wales release nearly a thousand water voles in 2009

Water voles reach 14–22 centimetres (5.5–8.7 in) in length, plus a tail which is about half the length of the body. Weights reported for adults are variable. It is possible for large, optimal adults to weigh as much as 225 to 386 g (7.9 to 13.6 oz). However, these are peak weights. Elsewhere, the mean body mass has been reported as 60 to 140 g (2.1 to 4.9 oz), although this figure includes immature water voles. The minimum weight to successfully breed as well as to survive winter is reportedly 112 g (4.0 oz) in females and 115 g (4.1 oz) in males. As a species, the mean body mass is claimed as 140 g (4.9 oz).

Overall, European water voles are a uniform dark brown colour, with slightly paler coloration on the underside. Their pelage is quite thick, and they are furred over their entire body, including their tail, unlike rats. Their dark colour allows them to blend in well in the densely vegetated areas they inhabit.

== Taxonomy ==
The binomial applied to the European water vole is Arvicola amphibius; it was formerly known by the junior synonym A. terrestris. The confusion stems from the fact that Linnaeus described two species of water vole on the same page of the same work. Those two forms are now universally considered the same species. It has been recognized as A. amphibius (Linnaeus, 1758) because the first source to unite the two forms, which Linnaeus had treated separately, into a single species chose A. amphibius as the valid name. The species is widely known by the synonym A. terrestris, which for many decades was treated as the valid name.

Some authorities consider the southwestern water vole (A. sapidus) to be the same species, but it is now generally considered distinct.

== Range ==
The European water vole is found in most of Europe, Russia, West Asia and Kazakhstan.

== Habitat ==
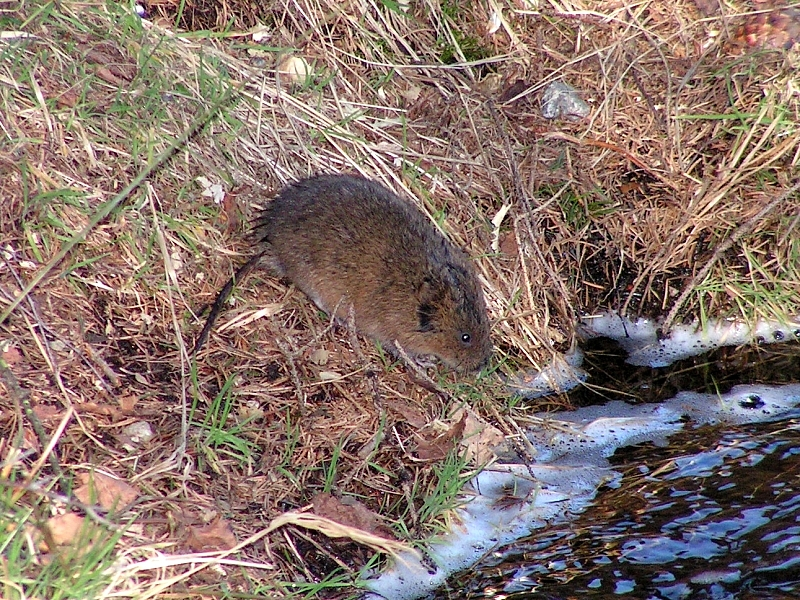
Water vole, Ore Mountains, Germany

In Britain, water voles live in burrows excavated within the banks of rivers, ditches, ponds, and streams. Burrows are normally located adjacent to slow-moving, calm water, which they seem to prefer. They also live in reed beds, where they will weave ball-shaped nests above ground if no suitable banks exist in which to burrow.

Water voles prefer lush riparian vegetation, which provides important cover to conceal animals when they are above ground adjacent to the water body. Areas of heavily grazed and trampled riparian habitats are generally avoided. Water voles may be displaced by the introduction of riparian woodland and scrub, as they prefer more open wetland habitats away from tree cover.

As well as frequenting typical lowland wetland habitats dominated by rank marginal aquatic vegetation, water voles are also just as at home in areas of upland 'peatland' vegetation where they utilize suitable small ditches, rivers, and lochs surrounded by moorland up to 1,000 m (3,300 ft) asl (e.g., northern Scotland).

In Europe and Russia, they may venture into woods, fields, and gardens. They live under the snow during the winter.

Water voles are currently being reintroduced as a threatened species in Yorkshire, England. In the Massif Central area of France, however, farmers are campaigning for action to be taken against water voles, where plagues of these rodents are causing major damage to crops.

== Diet ==
Water vole eating

Water voles mainly eat grass, sedges, rushes, herbs, and other vegetation near the water, but will also consume fruits, seeds, bulbs, twigs, buds, and roots when given the opportunity. In Europe, rich harvest periods can cause water vole "plagues" to take place, during which the voles eat ravenously, destroying entire fields of grass and leaving the fields full of burrows. Water voles in some parts of England have been shown to occasionally prey on water snails, freshwater mussels, other mollusks, frogs, and tadpoles; it has been speculated that this is to make up for a protein deficiency in the voles' diet.

Food remains alone are not a reliable indicator of the presence of this species, as other smaller voles can also leave remains of large grasses and rushes.

== Breeding ==
The mating period lasts from March into late autumn. The female vole's pregnancy lasts for approximately 21 days. Up to 8 baby voles can be born, each weighing around 10 grams (0.4 oz). The young voles open their eyes three days after their birth. They are half the size of a full-grown water vole by the time they are weaned.

== Behaviour ==
Water voles are expert swimmers and divers. They do not usually live in large groups. Adult water voles each have their own territory, which they mark with fecal latrines located either near the nest or burrow, or at favoured water's edge platforms where voles leave or enter the water. Latrines are a good survey indicator of this species and can be used to gauge the abundance of animals. They also scent-mark by using a secretion from their bodies (a flank gland), although this is not normally detectable during a field survey. They may attack if their territory is invaded by another water vole.

== Predation ==
As a large and common microtine rodent, the range of predators faced by the European water vole is extensive. However, many species of predator prefer other rodents, such as Microtus voles and wood mice, due to their greater abundance. Wildcats, red foxes, most species of hawk (especially common buzzards), owl (especially the barn owl, genus Strix, and Eurasian eagle-owl) and falcon (in large numbers by the common kestrel) in their range are among their reported predators. A very large number are also taken by mustelids. Reportedly small Mustela weasels as well as European and introduced American mink may take the largest number of water voles of any predator due in part to aligning habitat preferences. The rarely checked invasive population of American mink has reportedly caused a decline of water voles in Britain.

== Conservation ==
=== United Kingdom ===
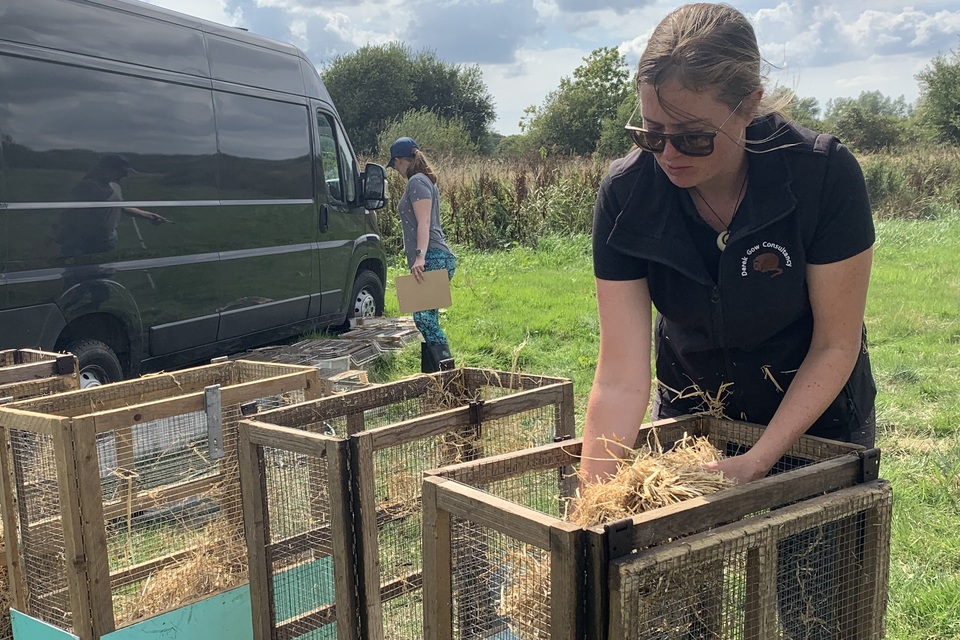
'Release pens' being set up for water voles that had been bred in captivity set to be released to bolster the numbers of a colony in Ringwood, Hampshire

In 2006, water voles had returned to Lindow Common nature reserve in Cheshire, after many years of absence.

On 26 February 2008, the U.K. Government announced full legal protection for water voles would be introduced from 6 April 2008.

In 2015, People's Trust for Endangered Species launched a new project to try to coordinate conservation efforts for the water-vole in the U.K. The National Water-Vole Monitoring Programme (NWVMP) is the first ongoing monitoring scheme for this species in the U.K. and aims to bring together data from several hundred sites to allow the status of this animal to be assessed year-on-year. In September 2019, the Box Moor Trust re-introduced 177 water voles in to the River Bulbourne in Hemel Hempstead as part of a three-year plan.

== Literary appearances ==
A water vole named "Ratty" is a leading character in the 1908 children's book The Wind in the Willows by Kenneth Grahame: the locality used in the book is believed to be Moor Copse in Berkshire, England, and the character's name "Ratty" has become widely associated with the species and their riverbank habitat, as well as the misconception that they are a species of rat. There are also watervoles in the works of Redwall by Brian Jacques.

In the comic novel and film Cold Comfort Farm by Stella Gibbons, one of the characters, Urk, refers to the subject of his unrequited love, Elfine Starkadder, as his little water vole. Throughout the story, Urk spends a lot of time talking to the water voles on the farm.

C. S. Calverley, a 19th-century writer of (among other things) light verse, in his poem "Shelter", beginning:

By the wide lake's margin I mark'd her lie—
The wide, weird lake where the alders sigh—

Tells of an apparently shy, easily frightened young female by a lakeside, who in the last line of the poem, it is revealed that:

For she was a water-rat.

The Rolling Stones song "Live with Me" includes the line "My best friend he shoots water rats and feeds them to his geese", referring to Keith Richards' habit of shooting water voles in the moat of his Redlands, West Wittering home.
