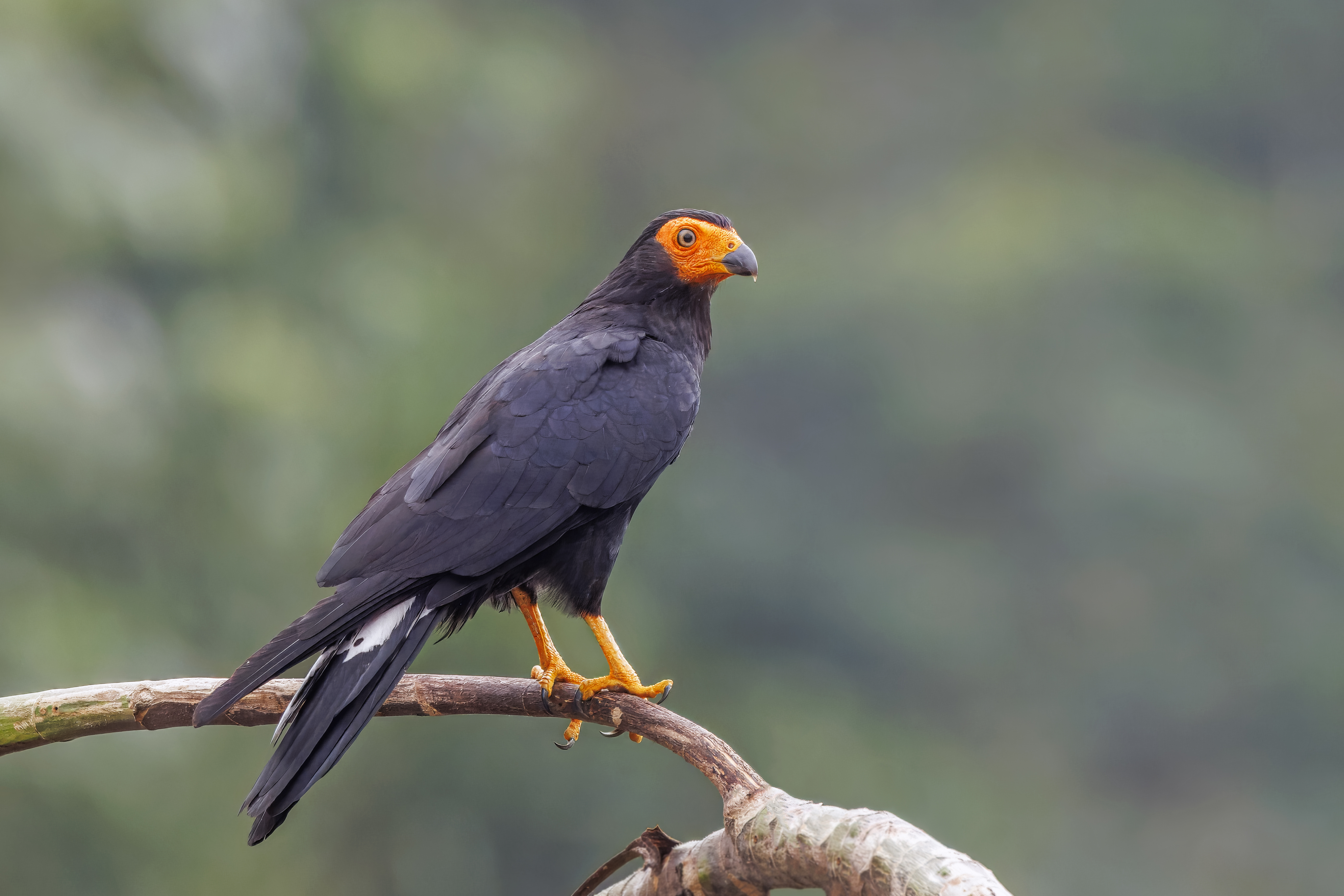
- Black caracara Daptrius ater

Scientific classification
- Kingdom: Animalia
- Phylum: Chordata
- Class: Aves
- Order: Falconiformes
- Family: Falconidae
- Subfamily: Polyborinae or Caracarinae

Genera
- Daptrius; Ibycter; Caracara

= Caracara (subfamily) =

Subfamily of birds

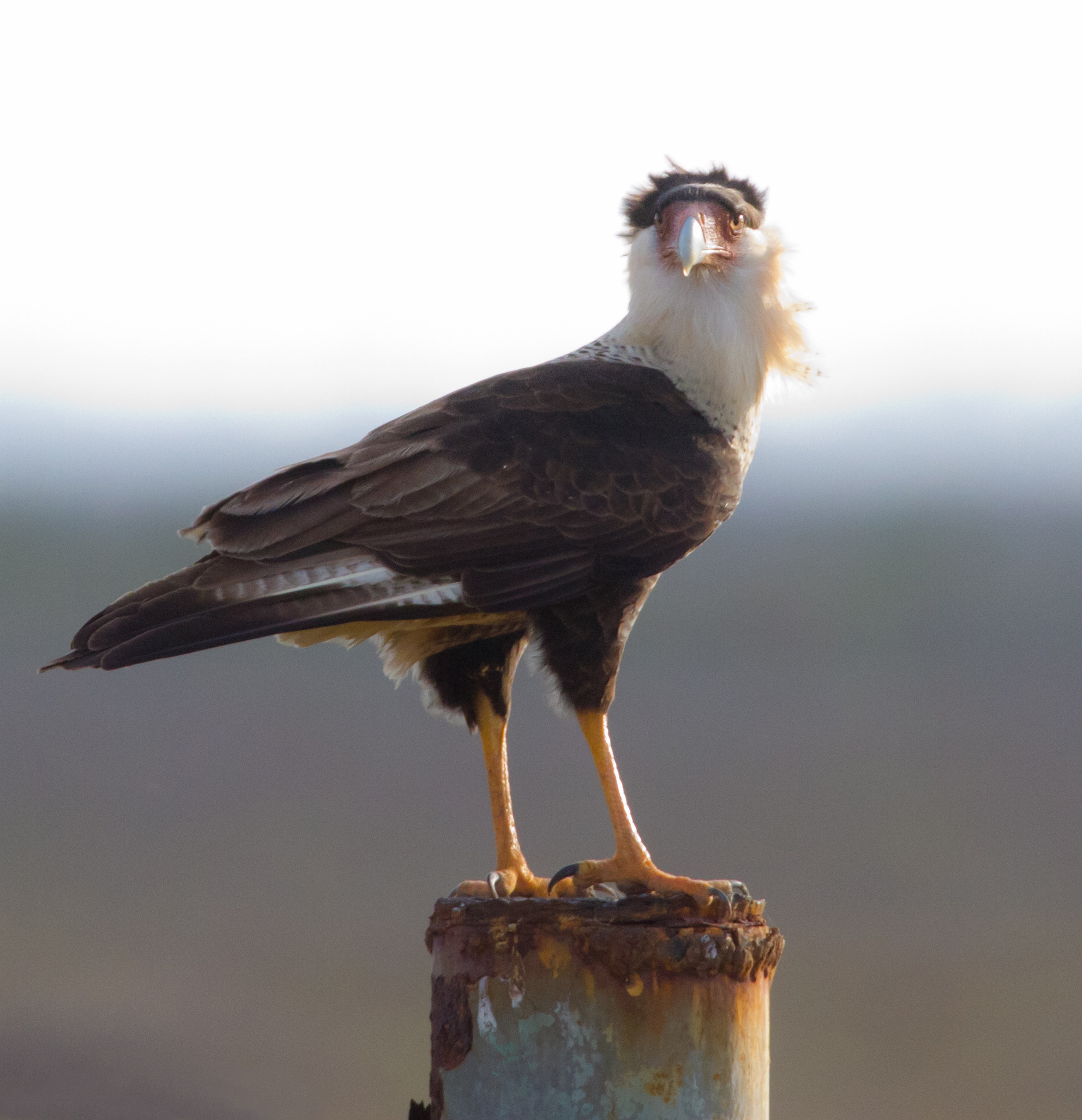
Crested caracara, Brazoria National Wildlife Refuge

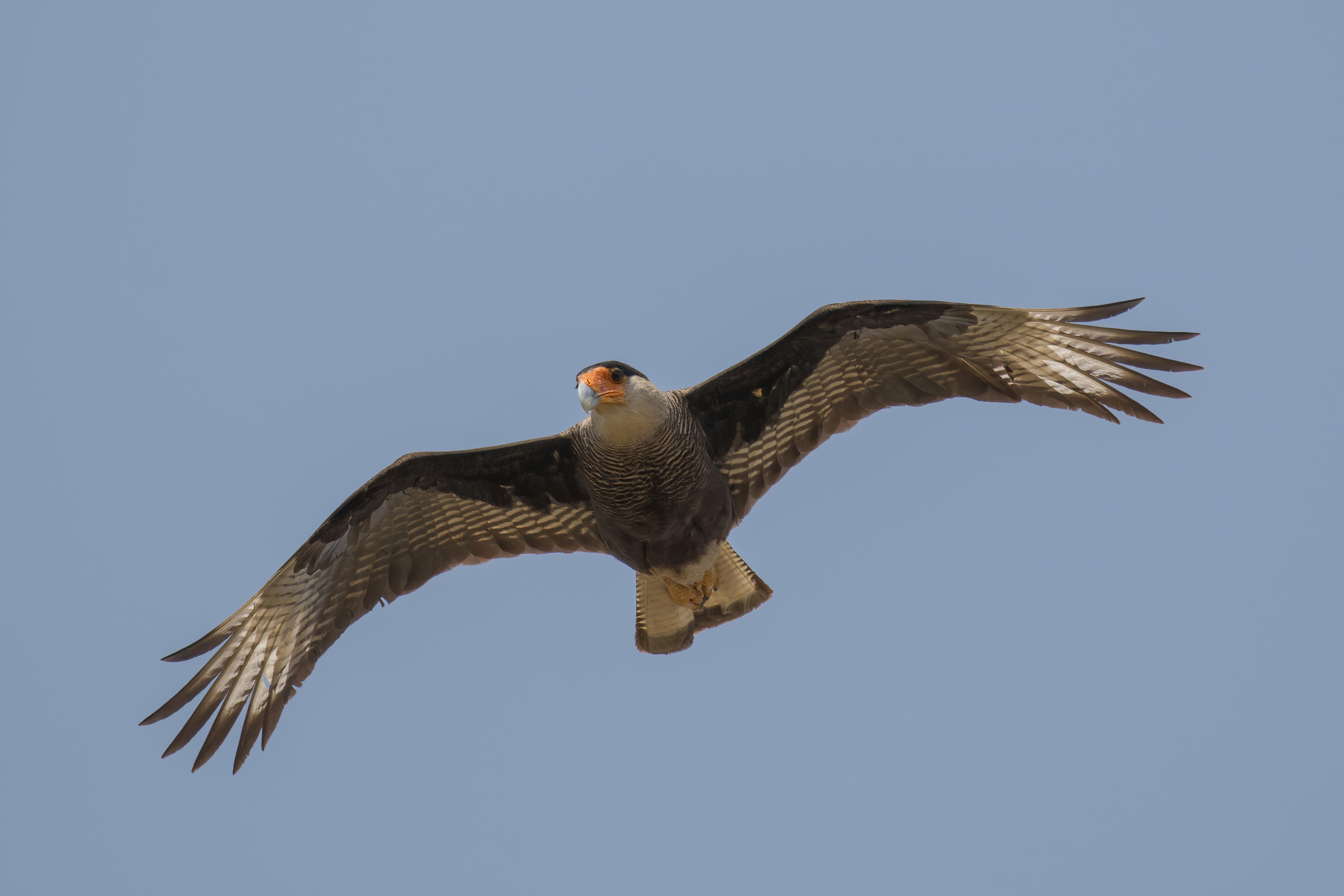
Crested caracara (C. plancus) in flight

Caracaras are birds of prey in the family Falconidae. They are traditionally placed in subfamily Polyborinae with the forest falcons, but are sometimes considered to constitute their own subfamily, Caracarinae, or classified as members of the true falcon subfamily, Falconinae. Caracaras are principally birds of South and Central America, just reaching the Southern United States.

Unlike the Falco falcons in the same family, the birds in the five relevant genera are not fast-flying, aerial hunters, but are comparatively slow and are often scavengers (a notable exception being the red-throated caracara).

== Species ==
Image	Genus	Living species
	Daptrius Vieillot, 1816	D. chimachima (Vieillot, 1816) – yellow-headed caracara; D. ater Vieillot, 1816 – black caracara; D. chimango (Vieillot, 1816) – Chimango caracara; D. carunculatus Des Murs, 1853 – carunculated caracara; D. megalopterus (Meyen, 1834) – mountain caracara; D. albogularis (Gould, 1837) – white-throated caracara; D. australis (Gmelin, 1788) – striated caracara
	Ibycter Vieillot, 1816	I. americanus (Boddaert, 1783) – red-throated caracara (formerly in Daptrius)
	Caracara Merrem, 1826	C. plancus (Miller, 1777) – Crested caracara; †C. lutosa (Ridgway, 1876) – Guadalupe caracara (extinct, 1903)

== Distribution ==
The caracaras are found throughout much of the Americas. The range of the crested caracara extends as far north as the states of Arizona, Texas, and Florida in the United States. In the Southern Hemisphere, the striated caracara inhabits the Falkland Islands and Tierra del Fuego, just off the coast of the southernmost tip of South America.

== Taxonomy ==
The genus Caracara Merrem 1826 was previously known as Polyborus Vieillot 1816. Hence, the differing subfamily names Polyborinae or Caracarinae. In addition, different authors give differing scopes to the subfamily, sometimes including the forest falcons, laughing falcon, or spot-winged falconet.

Peters' checklist in 1931 listed the caracaras in their own subfamily, Polyborinae, containing Daptrius, Milvago, Phalcobœnus, and Polyborus. Ibycter americanus is included as Daptrius americanus.

Whilst recognizing "three major, deep divisions in the Falconidae", the South American Classification Committee (SACC) of the American Ornithologists' Union voted in 2007 to recognize two subfamilies: Herpetotherinae containing the forest falcons and Falconinae containing the caracaras and true falcons.

Based on recent research in molecular genetics, John Boyd places the spot-winged falconet (Spiziapteryx) in the Caracarinae, and the forest falcons in the Herpetotherinae. He also comments that "many of the caracaras are closely related, and it would not be unreasonable to merge Ibycter, Milvago, and Phalcoboenus into Daptrius".
