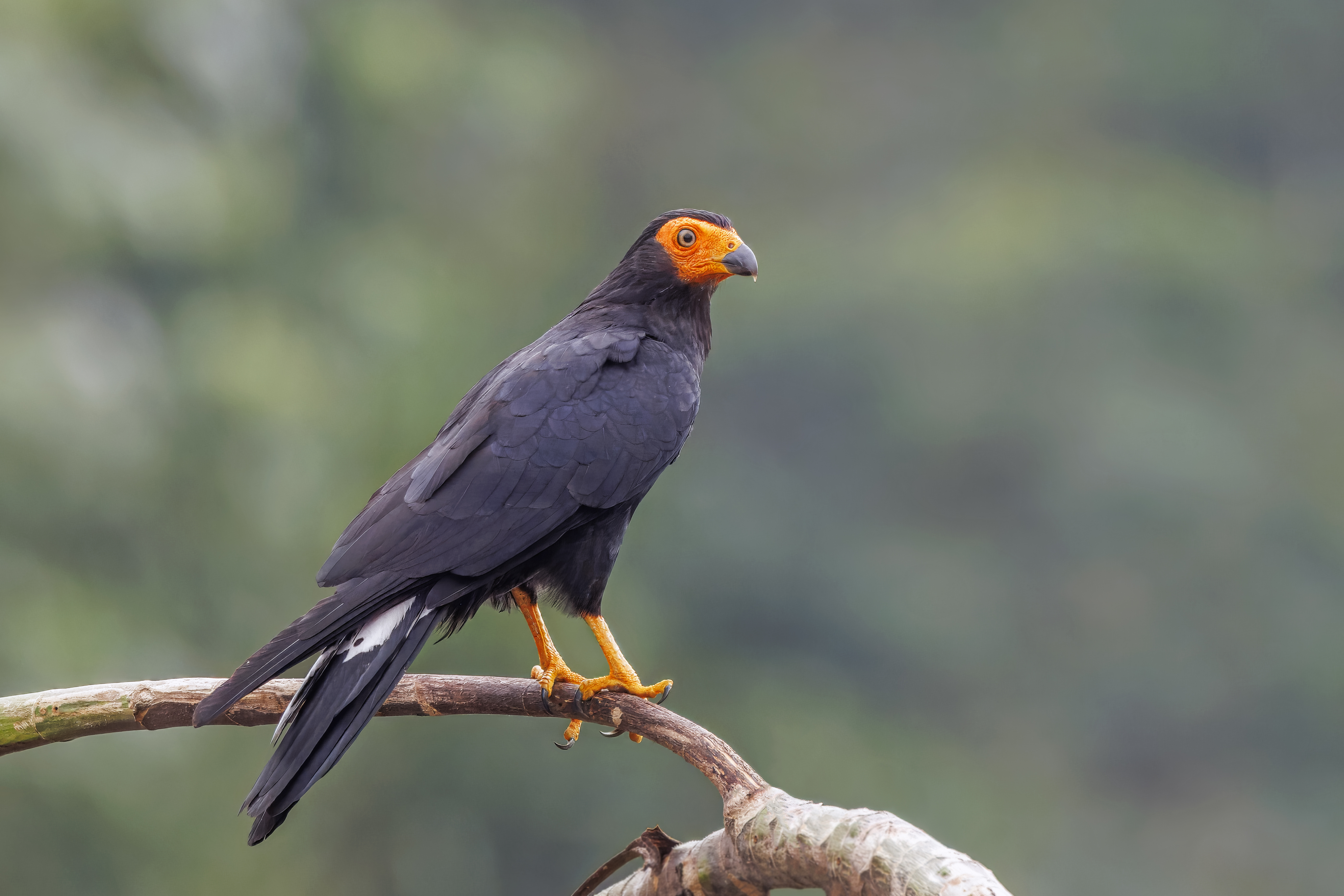
- In Ecuador

Conservation status
- Least Concern (IUCN 3.1)

Scientific classification
- Kingdom: Animalia
- Phylum: Chordata
- Class: Aves
- Order: Falconiformes
- Family: Falconidae
- Subfamily: Polyborinae
- Genus: Daptrius
- Species: D. ater

Binomial name
- Daptrius ater Vieillot, 1816

= Black caracara =

Species of bird

The black caracara (Daptrius ater) is a bird of prey in the family Falconidae that is found in Amazonian and French Guianan lowlands, mainly occurring along rivers. It was formerly the only species placed in the genus Daptrius but based on genetic studies the genus now includes species that were formerly placed in the genera Milvago and Phalcoboenus.

Since migration has not been observed, they are considered resident, or sedentary, remaining in the tropics year round.

The black caracara is a widespread and sociable raptor, often spotted in groups of 2–5 individuals in tall trees. Nests, built from sticks and usually containing 2–3 brown-spotted eggs, have been observed high in trees, yet little is known of their breeding habits or reproduction. Typical of caracaras, D. ater is an omnivore as well as an opportunist, known simultaneously as a predator, scavenger and a forager; together with other American raptors, particularly the Cathartidae (new world vultures) and the condors, the black caracara benefits the greater environment by consuming carrion.

== Taxonomy ==
The black caracara was formally described in 1816 by the French ornithologist Louis Vieillot under the binomial name Daptrius ater. He specified the locality as Brazil. The specific epithet ater is from Latin meaning "black", "dark" or "dull". The black caracara was formerly the only species placed in the genus Daptrius. Molecular genetic studies found that the genus Milvago was polyphyletic with the chimango caracara sister to the genus Phalcoboenus and the yellow-headed caracara sister to the genus Daptrius. As the genetic divergence was relatively shallow, the polyphyly was resolved by expanding the genus Daptrius to include the species in the genera Milvago and Phalcoboenus.

It is locally referred to as Ger' futu busikaka in the Republic of Suriname, and juápipi {nẽjõmbʌ} by the Emberá of Panamá and Colombia. However, both of these names refer to multiple bird species within the Falconidae. German-Brazilian ornithologist Helmut Sick also referred to this species as gavião-de-anta, literally translating to "tapir-hawk".

== Description ==
Adult black caracara are a glossy black except for the distinctive white band on the base of the tail, and yellow to orange-red feet and face. The adults appear similar to those of their closest relative, the red-throated caracara, however they have distinctly long and narrow wings and tail, as well as a black beak. Additionally, the red-throated caracara can be distinguished from the black caracara by their red throats. The average adult length is 41–47 cm (16–19 in)-. The females of this species average 350–440 g (12–16 oz) and are typically larger than the males that have an average weight of 330 g (12 oz). Juveniles can be identified by their dull black plumage, pale yellow face and the 3-4 black bars found on the rectrices.

When observing flight from a distance, it is notable that Daptrius ater rarely soars, but instead can be seen continuously flapping.

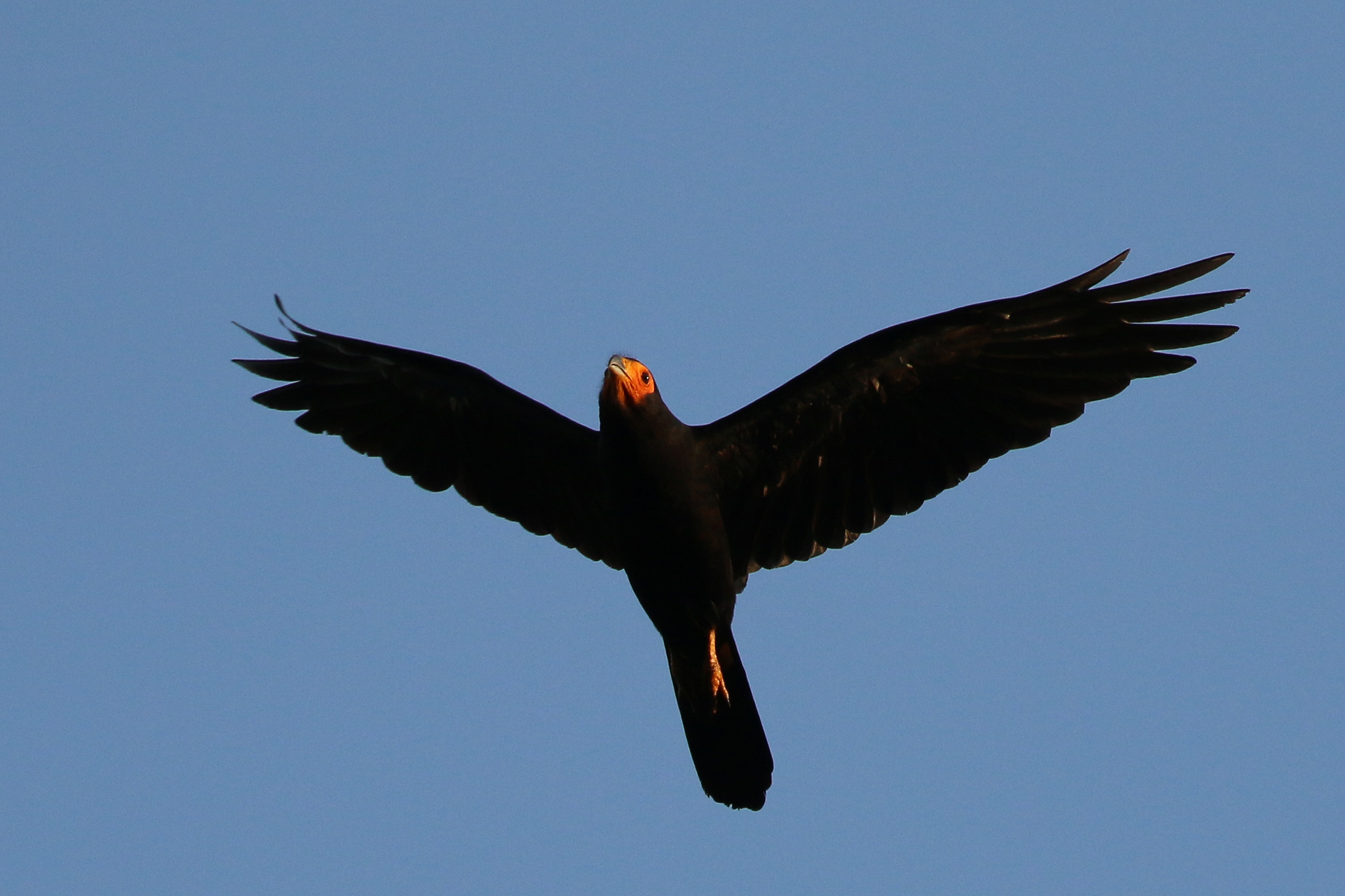
In flight, Pantanal, Brazil

== Distribution and habitat ==
It is found in Bolivia, Brazil, Colombia, Ecuador, French Guiana, Guyana, Peru, Suriname, and Venezuela. Its natural habitats are subtropical or tropical moist lowland forest and heavily degraded former forest. Common habitats include gallery forest and wooded savanna that are situated between altitudes of 0 to 900 m (0 to 2,950 ft). Black caracara can also be found in mangroves and disturbed forested habitats along water.

== Behavior ==
The black caracara is most often seen in pairs or family groups, consisting of 3–5 birds, but may also be spotted alone. They have been observed flying in straight patterns with active wing-flapping, gliding, walking along rivers, and perching in tall trees. Other common sightings have famously associated them with tapir and capybara, as they have been observed cleaning ectoparasites and insects from the animals' fur. This interaction can be considered mutualistic, as tapirs will often solicit black caracaras, by emitting a call; the tapirs then lay still on the ground to attract the caracaras for insect and tick removal. Black caracara also scavenge around human settlements, consume carrion, and exhibit the ability to catch fish along rivers and in lakes.

=== Food and feeding ===
The black caracara is known to eat almost anything, from vegetation to carrion to live prey; therefore, they are best described as an opportunistic omnivorous predator. More specifically, their diet may consist of nestlings and fledglings of numerous other bird species, mature smaller birds (such as flycatchers, parrots, pigeons), small mammals, frogs, lizards, snakes, numerous invertebrates, small fish, palm nuts and numerous varieties of fruits. With this diverse diet, they have developed many unique foraging and hunting strategies, including directly attacking the nests of other birds, searching the canopy foliage with their beaks for insects, and showing no fear around humans, when scavenging near towns or garbage sites.

The diverse list of feeding strategies includes foraging small fish within their riverine habitats. The black caracara makes use of exposed rocks and emergent vegetation in and along rivers, walking slowly on these surfaces while peering into the water for small fish such as species of Characidae. Once the prey is spotted, it is caught using either the bill or talons then carried away from the river for consumption. Black caracara mostly fish in areas of fast moving rivers where migratory fish are forced to bottleneck and become trapped among plants or within shallow pools, reflecting their opportunistic nature.

=== Breeding ===
There is only one observational record of a black caracara nest in Brazil being built from twigs 60–70 cm (24–28 in) in length, 25 m (82 ft) high in a tree. Little else is known about their reproductive behaviors.

=== Vocalization ===
This species can also be identified from other species by their harsh, piercing, single note kraaaa calls that usually occur during flight. This call is usually repeated several times, often ending in a decrescendo. They do not exhibit diverse vocalizations, restricted to variations in length and volume of their distinctive shriek.

== Conservation status ==
IUCN estimates a fluctuating population of 1000–10,000 individuals, with an adult population of 670–6700. Population declines have been documented over the past 10 years; however, it is not presently considered critical. The designation of least concern is attributed to their large range, ability to survive in fragmented forest, and their diverse diet.
