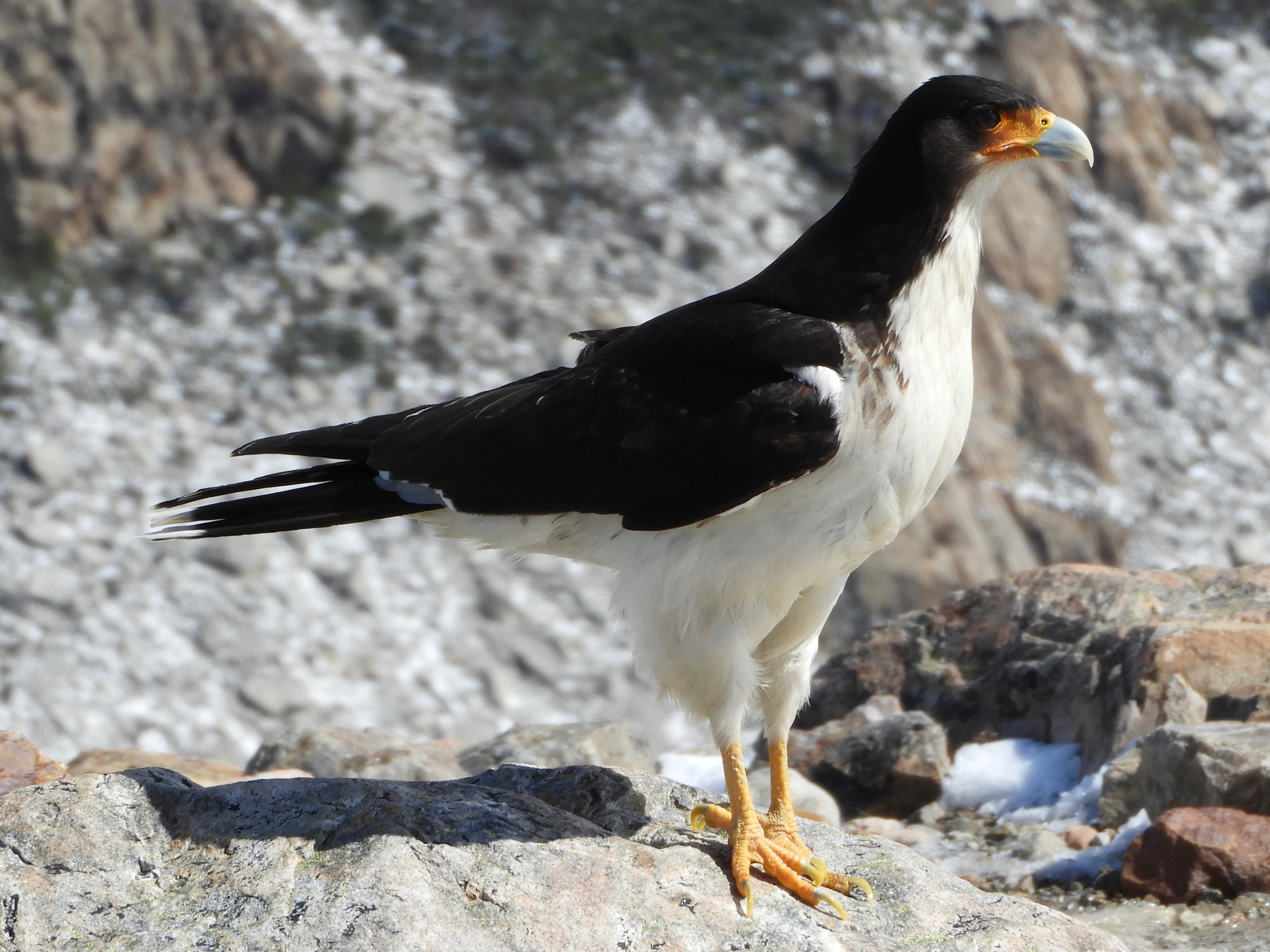

Conservation status
- Least Concern (IUCN 3.1)
- CITES Appendix II

Scientific classification
- Kingdom: Animalia
- Phylum: Chordata
- Class: Aves
- Order: Falconiformes
- Family: Falconidae
- Genus: Daptrius
- Species: D. albogularis

Binomial name
- Daptrius albogularis (Gould, 1837)

Synonyms
- Phalcoboenu albogularis

= White-throated caracara =

Species of bird

The white-throated caracara (Daptrius albogularis), also known as Darwin's caracara, is a species of bird of prey in the family Falconidae, the falcons and caracaras. It is found in Argentina and Chile.

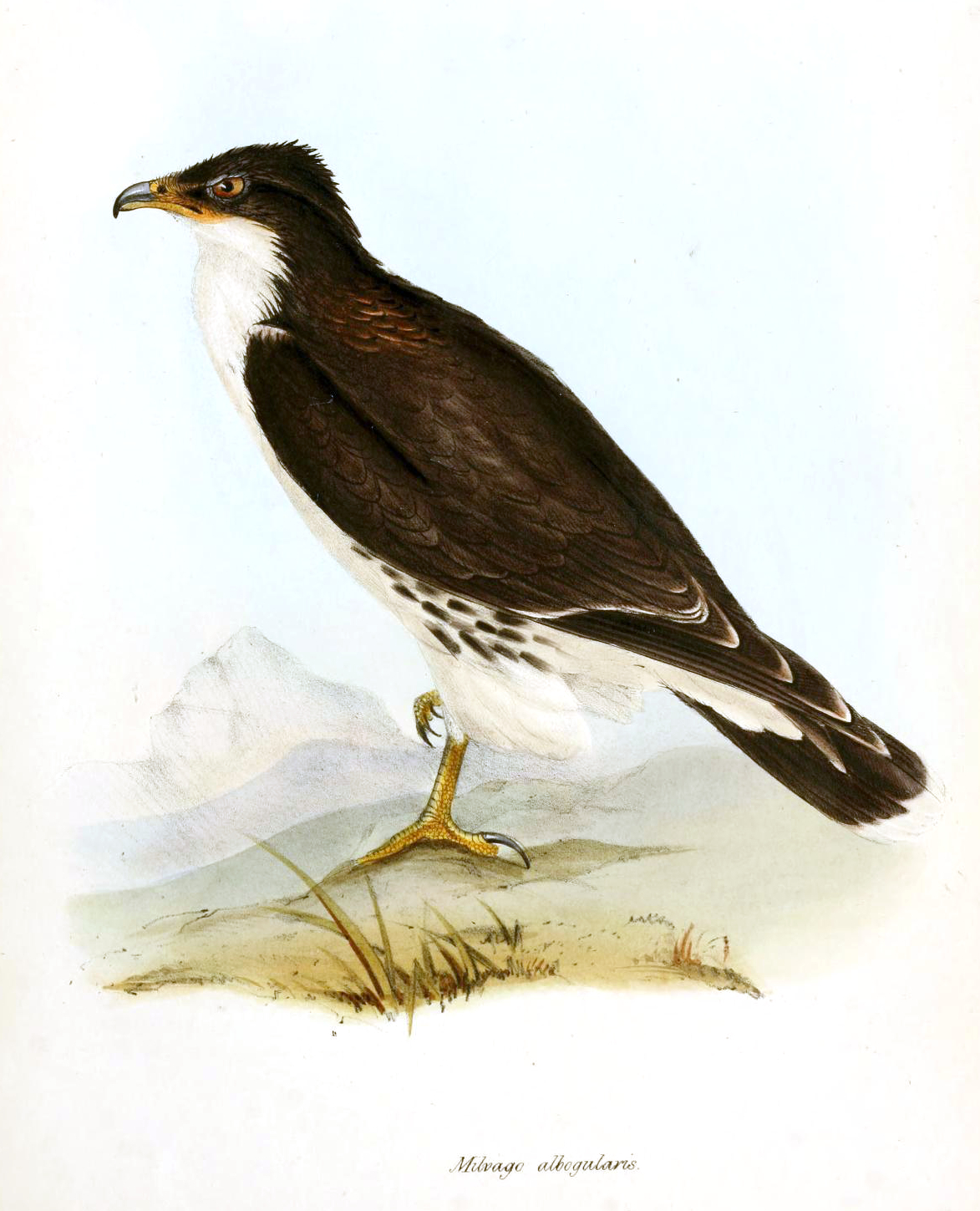
1841 illustration of white-throated caracara by Gould

== Taxonomy and systematics ==
The white-throated caracara was formally described in 1837 by the English ornithologist John Gould based on a specimen belonging to Charles Darwin that had been collected in Santa Cruz, Patagonia. Gould was uncertain about how to classify the specimen and gave the scientific name as Polyborus (Phalcobaenus) albogularis. The specific epithet combines Latin albus meaning "white" with Modern Latin gularis meaning "throated" or "of the throat". The white-throated caracara was formerly placed in the genus Phalcoboenus. Molecular genetic studies found that the genus Milvago was polyphyletic with the chimango caracara sister to the genus Phalcoboenus and the yellow-headed caracara sister to the genus Daptrius. As the genetic divergence was relatively shallow, the polyphyly was resolved by expanding the genus Daptrius to include the species formerly placed in the genera Milvago and Phalcoboenus. The species is monotypic: no subspecies are recognised.

The white-throated caracara and the carunculated caracara were formerly treated as subspecies of the mountain caracara but the three are now considered a superspecies due to their shallow genetic differences. Possible hybrids between the white-throated and mountain caracaras have been reported but not widely accepted.

== Description ==
The white-throated caracara is 49 to 55 cm (19 to 22 in) long with a wingspan of 110 to 124 cm (43 to 49 in). It has a small crest, long wings with clear "fingers" on the tips, and a long rounded tail. The sexes' plumages are alike. Adults' upperparts are mostly brownish black to black with white uppertail coverts. Their underparts and tips of the tail feathers are pure unmarked white. The undersides of their primaries have black and white bands at their base. Their bare facial skin is yellow-orange, their iris is hazel to brown, and their legs and feet yellow. Juveniles have dark brown upperparts and bluish white facial skin, legs, and feet.

== Distribution and habitat ==
The white-throated caracara is the southernmost member of the "mountain caracara" superspecies. It is found from south-central Chile's Los Lagos Region and southwest part of Argentina's Mendoza Province south to Tierra del Fuego and Cape Horn. It inhabits open mountain slopes, southern beech (Nothofagus) forest, open woodland, and dense scrublands. In Chile it ranges in elevation from about 500 to 2,500 m (1,600 to 8,200 ft) and in Argentina from sea level to 3,000 m (9,800 ft).

== Behavior ==
=== Movement ===
The white-throated caracara's movements are imperfectly known; the species is thought to be somewhat nomadic.

=== Feeding ===
Information is sparse on the white-throated caracara's diet and foraging behavior. It is known to feed on carrion, for instance dead guanaco (Lama guanicoe) and cattle, and has also been documented preying on small rodents. Small numbers gather with vultures at carcasses and with other caracara species at sheep slaughter, and it will attempt to drive off its competitors. It is thought to seek food while in flight rather than walking on the ground like some other caracaras.

=== Breeding ===
Little is known about the white-throated caracara's breeding biology. It builds a stick nest on a rock ledge. Its clutch of two or three eggs is probably laid in October-November. The incubation period, time to fledging, and details of parental care are not known.

=== Vocalization ===
As of early 2023, xeno-canto and the Cornell Lab of Ornithology's Macaulay Library each had only two recordings of white-throated caracara vocalizations. "The call is said to be a deeper version of that of Chimango" but the chimango caracara has "far more peevish whinings".

== Status ==
The IUCN has assessed the white-throated caracara as being of Least Concern. Though it has a restricted range and an estimated population of fewer than 6700 mature individuals, the latter is believed to be stable. No immediate threats have been identified. It is said to be common in Nothofagus forest, and occurs in at least three national parks. "Habitat not subject to much disturbance, and no persecution reported, so presumably not a species of immediate concern."
