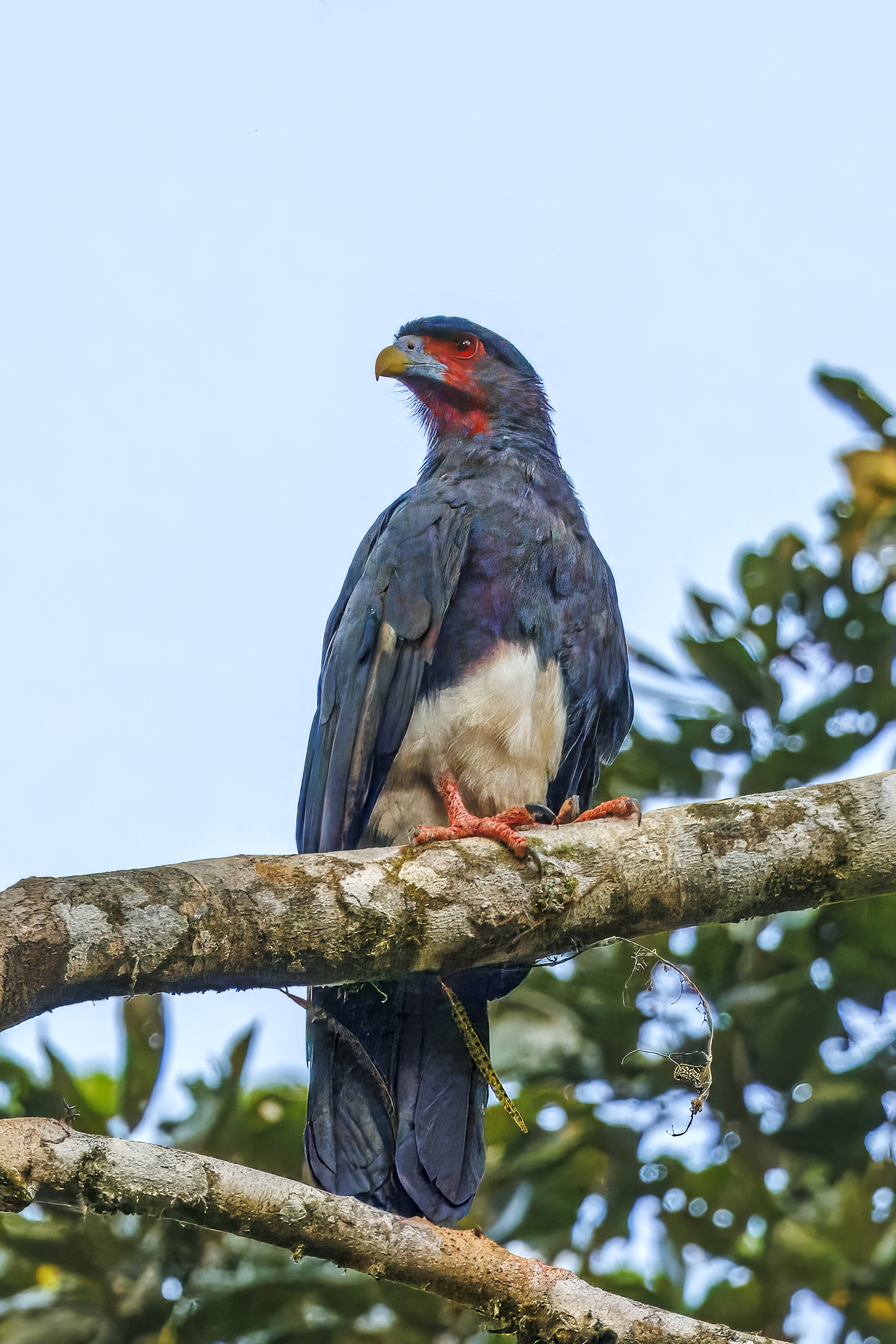
- In Ecuador

Conservation status
- Least Concern (IUCN 3.1)

Scientific classification
- Kingdom: Animalia
- Phylum: Chordata
- Class: Aves
- Order: Falconiformes
- Family: Falconidae
- Subfamily: Polyborinae
- Genus: Ibycter; Vieillot, 1816
- Species: I. americanus

Binomial name
- Ibycter americanus (Boddaert, 1783)

Synonyms
- Falco americanus Boddaert, 1783; Daptrius americanus (Boddaert, 1783)

= Red-throated caracara =

Species of bird

The red-throated caracara (Ibycter americanus) is a social species of bird of prey in the family Falconidae. It is placed in the monotypic genus Ibycter, or sometimes united in Daptrius with the black caracara. Unique among caracaras, it mainly feeds on the larvae of bees and wasps, but also takes the adult insects and fruits and berries.

It is found from far southern Mexico through parts of Central and South America south to Peru, Bolivia, and Brazil. Its natural habitats are subtropical or tropical moist lowland forests and subtropical or tropical moist montane forests.

== Taxonomy ==
The red-throated caracara was described by French polymath Georges-Louis Leclerc, Comte de Buffon in 1770 in his Histoire Naturelle des Oiseaux from a specimen collected in Cayenne, French Guiana. The bird was also illustrated in a hand-coloured plate engraved by François-Nicolas Martinet in the Planches Enluminées D'Histoire Naturelle which was produced under the supervision of Edme-Louis Daubenton to accompany Buffon's text. Neither the plate caption nor Buffon's description included a scientific name, but in 1783, Dutch naturalist Pieter Boddaert coined the binomial name Falco americanus in his catalogue of the Planches Enluminées.

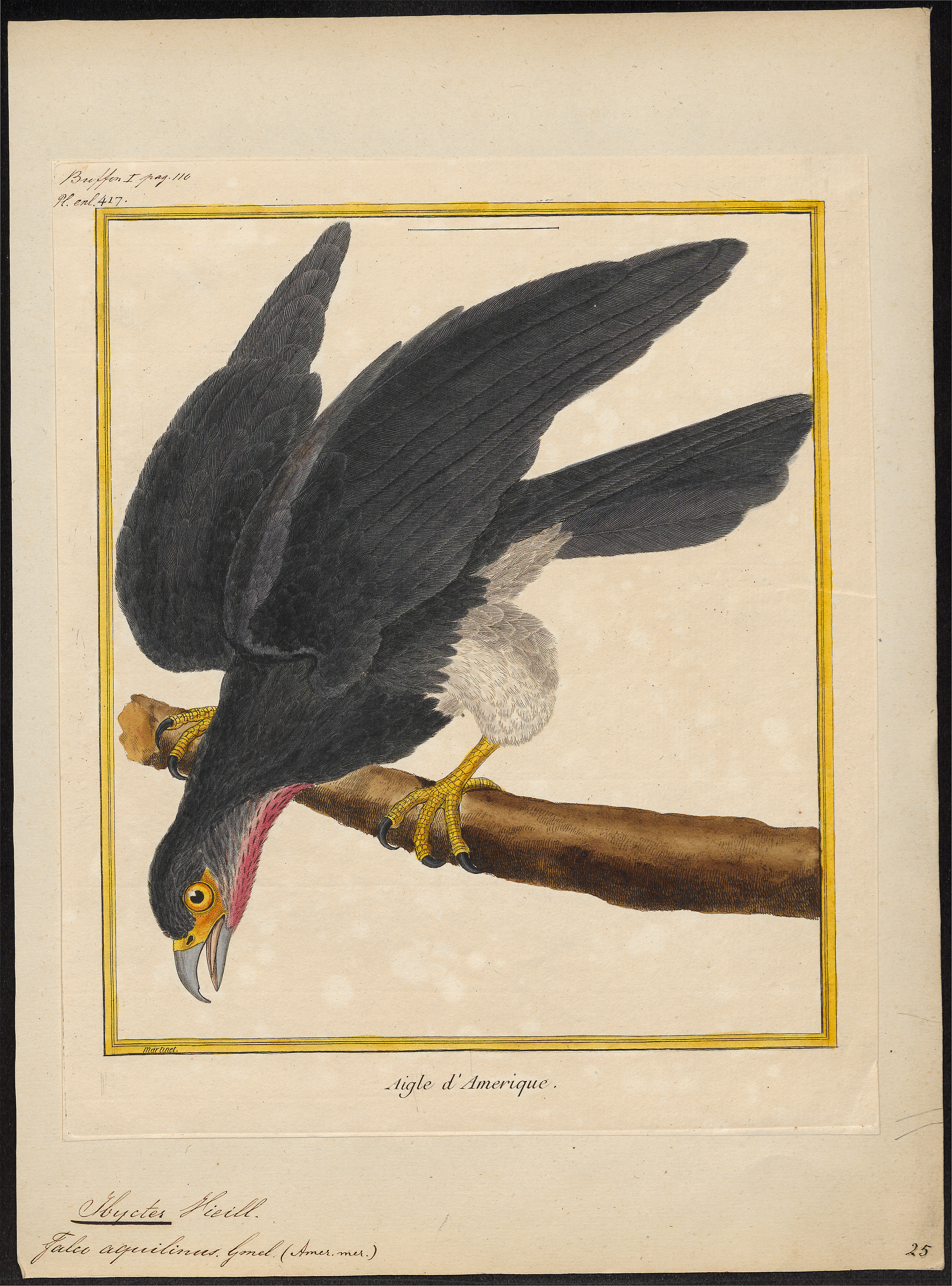
Late 1700s illustration from François-Nicolas Martinet's Planches Enluminées D'Histoire Naturelle

The red-throated caracara was for many years placed with the black caracara in the genus Daptrius, but based on a molecular genetic study published in 1999, it was moved to be the only species in the resurrected genus Ibycter that had been introduced by French ornithologist Louis Pierre Vieillot in 1816. The species is monotypic. The genus name Ibycter is from the Ancient Greek ibuktēr meaning "singer of war-songs".

== Description ==
Males average 20.1 in (51 cm) long, while females average 22.1 in (56 cm); they are distinguished from the black caracara by larger size and plumage that is mainly black, with the belly, tail feathers, and undertail feathers being white. Both their faces and throats are bare, with a few black feathers scattered on the throat; the exposed skin is red. Both male and female red-throated caracaras are similar in appearance. Males have a wing length of 35.55 cm, a tail length of 24.96 cm, a bill length of 2.5 cm, and a tarsal length of 5.41 cm. Females have a wing length of 35.93 cm, a tail length of 25.31 cm, a bill length of 2.58 cm, and a tarsal length of 5.62 cm.

== Distribution and habitat ==
This species inhabits the humid lowland forests of Brazil, Bolivia, Colombia, Costa Rica, El Salvador, Ecuador, French Guiana, Guatemala, Guyana, Honduras, Mexico, Nicaragua, Panama, Peru, and Venezuela. The slow flight of the red-throated caracara makes it suited it to fly in the understory of the forest where the vegetation is thin. The sparse vegetation gives the red-throated caracara greater visibility to spot food and predators. The ornate hawk-eagle and the black-and-white hawk-eagle are predators of the red-throated caracara.

== Behaviour and ecology ==
=== Food and feeding ===
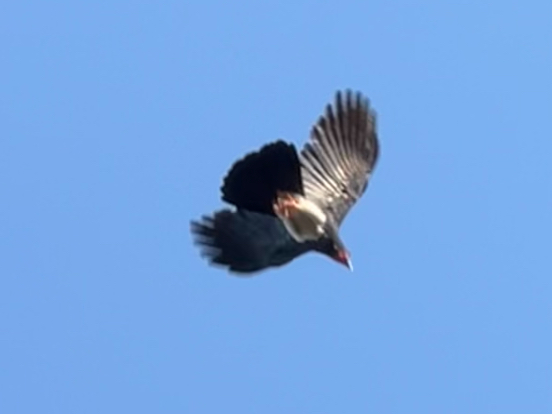
Ibycter americanus flying in the Inkaterra Lodge at Puerto Maldonado

The red-throated caracara hunts in the canopy and the understory of the lowland jungle, foraging mainly for insect nests. Most red-throated caracaras hunt silently, but occasionally make soft caws and sometimes hunt in groups. When hunting in groups, one or two individuals scout for predators in the canopy, while the remaining flock hunts in the understory. The red-throated caracara is highly territorial, with four to eight individuals in a group.

Their diet consists mainly of wasp and bee larvae, though they eat mature insects and also forage on fruits and berries found in the humid subtropical and tropical lowlands, and mountainous regions of their Central and South American habitat. Biodiversity of the forest ecosystem is paramount for the birds' special diet, since wasps and bees often make their nests in hollows or amongst branches of mature trees found in old-growth forests. Deforestation and intensive agriculture practices severely hamper the red-throated caracara's population, likely accounting for its rare sightings today. After the 1950s, both its population and range rapidly declined in Costa Rica, Honduras, Panama, Ecuador, and French Guiana, causing the species to be placed on the World Wildlife endangered list. Until 2013, very little was known of the red-throated caracara's feeding behavior until a team of Canadian biologists from the University of Simon Fraser spent months researching the birds using camera surveillance at the Nouragues Field Station in French Guiana. The scientific footage shows the birds using a rapid-fire "fly-by" aerial-diving attack strategy to knock nests down onto the forest floor, while skillfully evading most wasp stings. The birds use air squadron precision, repeatedly diving then scooping upward, to drive off or confuse angry defender swarms around the hive. Researchers also found that neotropical defender wasps eventually abandon their damaged hives and retreat, alongside smaller worker wasps, to rebuild a new nest site. All predators evolve ways of hunting or trapping prey. Biologist Sean McCann observed that these intelligent birds have a highly specialized predation trait in response the wasps' behavior to cut losses and rebuild elsewhere. The predation impact on the numbers of prey populations is undetermined. Furthermore, how much the red-throated caracara's primary food source, wasp larvae, places constraints on the birds' ability to survive is unknown, since their complex predation is interlinked with neotropical wasp behavior. Knowledge of the birds' chemical resistance to stings is also unknown. Chemical traces found on the birds' feet are similar to those secreted from Azteca ants, likely contacted along tree branches and nest sites that both species inhabit.
