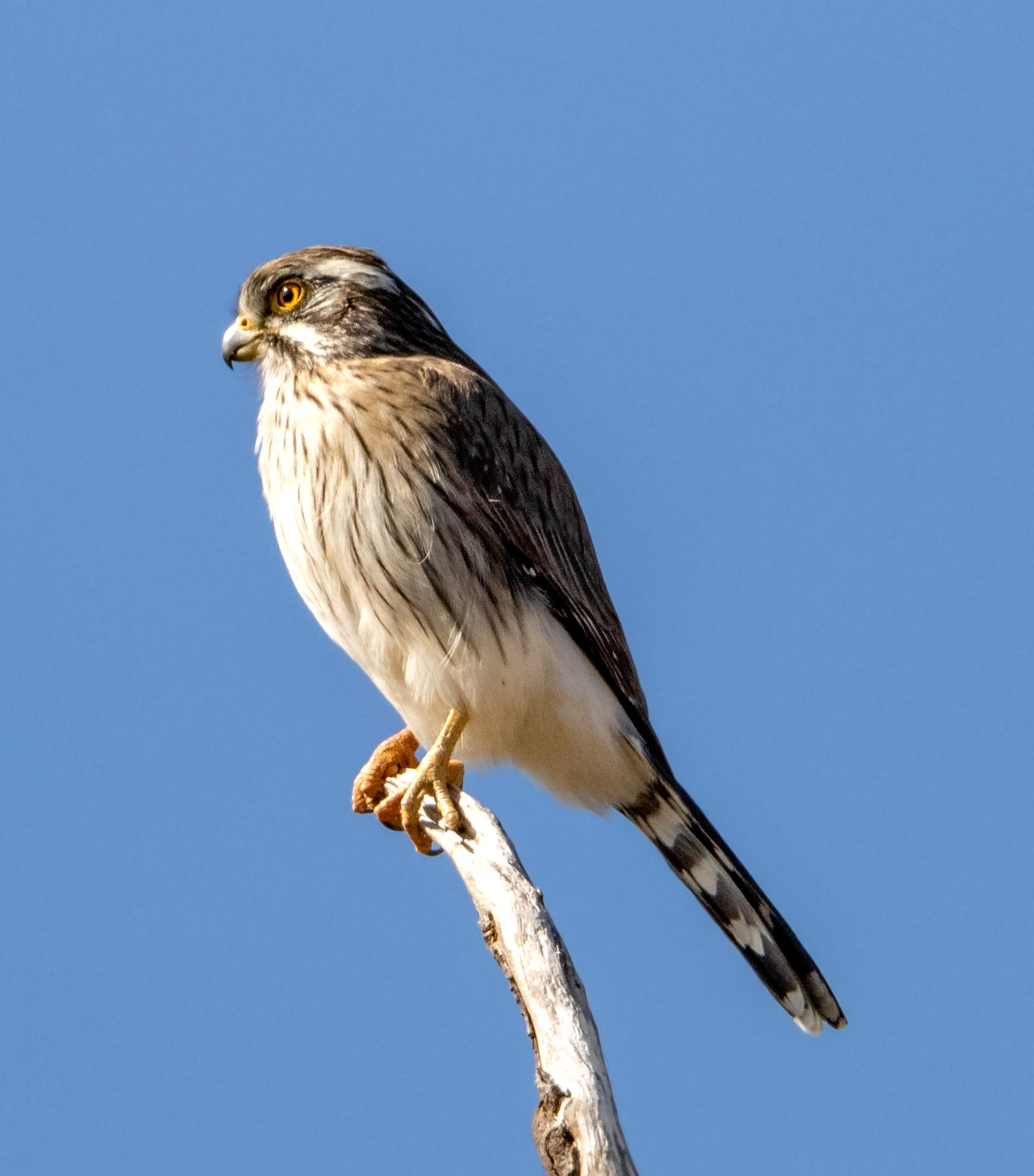
- Spot-winged falconet in Chancaní Natural Reserve, Córdoba Province, Argentina

Conservation status
- Least Concern (IUCN 3.1)
- CITES Appendix II

Scientific classification
- Kingdom: Animalia
- Phylum: Chordata
- Class: Aves
- Order: Falconiformes
- Family: Falconidae
- Genus: Spiziapteryx; Kaup, 1852
- Species: S. circumcincta

Binomial name
- Spiziapteryx circumcincta (Kaup, 1852)

= Spot-winged falconet =

Species of bird

The spot-winged falconet (Spiziapteryx circumcincta) is a species of bird of prey in family Falconidae, the falcons and caracaras. It is found in Argentina, Bolivia, Paraguay, and possibly Uruguay.

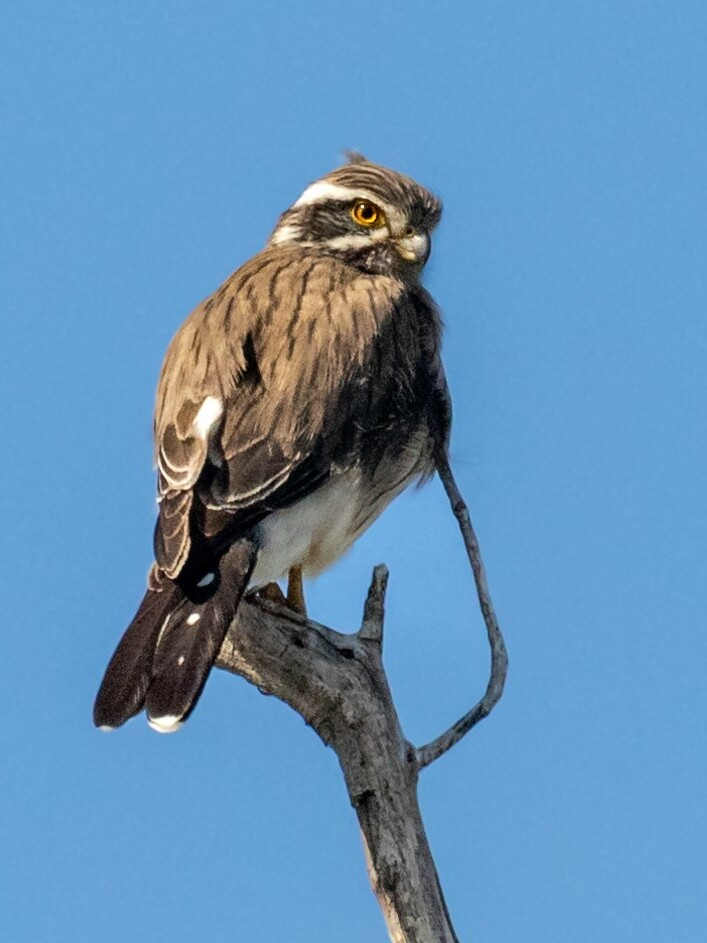
View from the rear

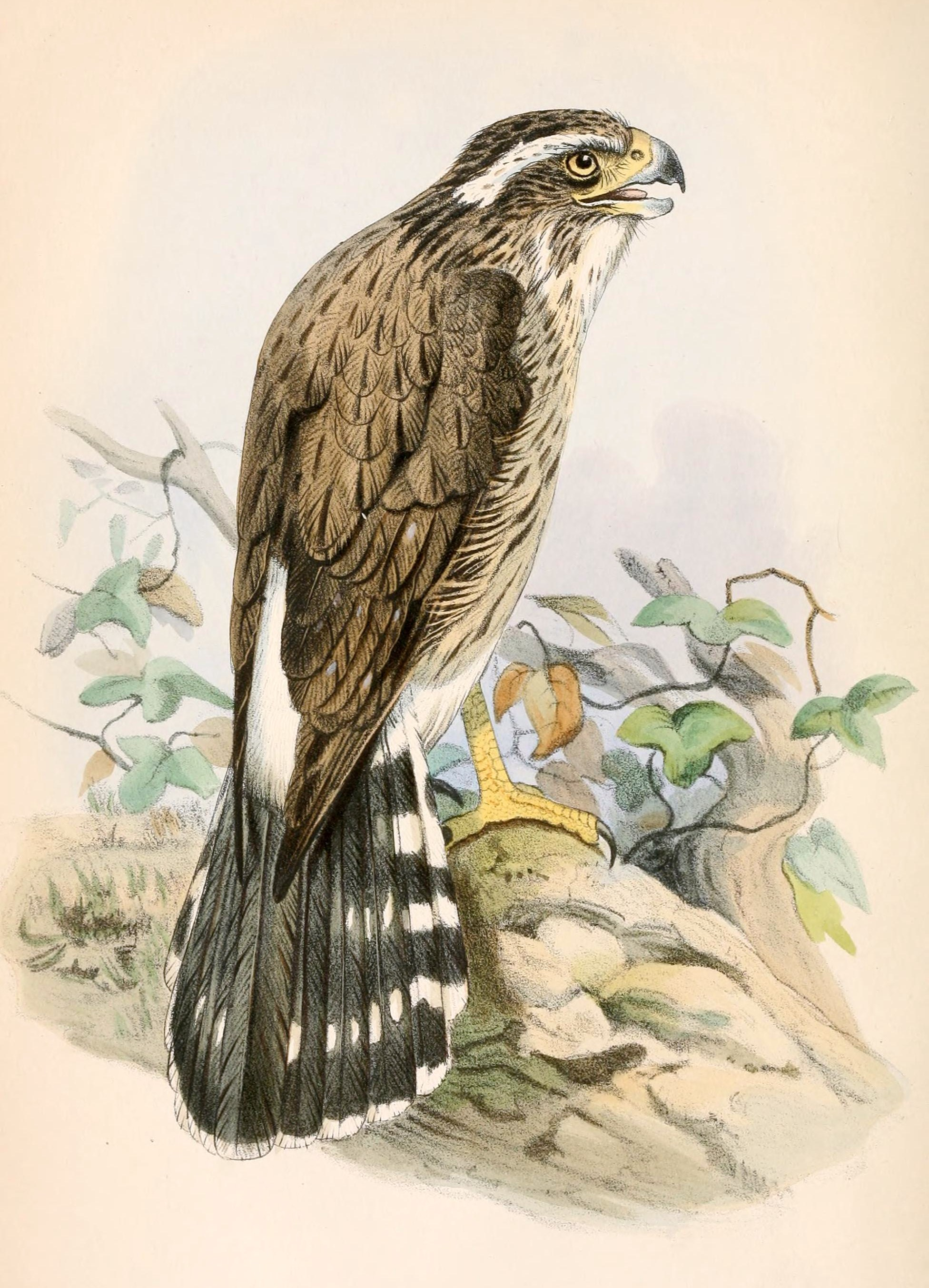
Illustration by John Jennens, 1862

== Taxonomy ==
The spot-winged falconet is the only member of genus Spiziapteryx and has no subspecies. Though by size and shape it appears to be a typical falcon, genetic data place it closer to the caracaras.

== Description ==
The spot-winged falconet is 25 to 31 cm (9.8 to 12 in) long and weighs 149 to 249 g (5.3 to 8.8 oz); females average about 8% heavier than males. Its wingspan is 47 to 58 cm (19 to 23 in) The sexes are alike, and juveniles have the same plumage as adults. The species is stocky with shortish wings and a fairly long tail. Their head, back, and wings are grayish brown with white spots on the wings and shoulders and a white rump. They have a pale supercilium that extends onto the neck. They have black ear coverts and a narrow black "moustache". Their throat is white, their breast, flanks, and upper belly are grayish with narrow brown streaks, and their lower belly is white. Their central tail feathers are dark and the rest dark with white bars and tips. Their iris is pale yellow, their cere and lores are rich yellow, and their legs and feet cream to yellow.

== Distribution and habitat ==
The spot-winged falconet is found from Bolivia's Santa Cruz Department south through Paraguay into Argentina as far south as Río Negro Province. Sight records in Uruguay unconfirmed by photographs or specimens lead the South American Classification Committee of the American Ornithological Society to treat it as hypothetical in that country. The spot-winged falconet inhabits the Gran Chaco in mostly-open landscapes such as savanna and semi-arid woodlands; all are characterized by scrub with scattered trees. In elevation it ranges from sea level to about 750 m (2,500 ft) but is believed to be most numerous between 100 and 500 m (300 and 1,600 ft).

== Behavior ==
=== Movement ===
The spot-winged falconet is believed to be a year-round resident, though individuals have wandered great distances.

=== Feeding ===
The spot-winged falconet's hunting techniques have not been fully described, but it is known to still-hunt from a perch. Its diet includes insects of many orders, lizards, small mammals, and birds as large as the rufous hornero (Furnarius rufus) and monk parakeet (Myiopsitta monachus).

=== Breeding ===
The spot-winged falconet lays eggs in Argentina during November and December. Birds in breeding condition have also been recorded between July and October, hinting at double-brooding. It nests in enclosed woven nests of other bird species such as cacholotes and in the active communal nests of monk parakeets. The clutch size is two to four eggs; the incubation period is not known; fledging is believed to occur about 33 days after hatch. Details of parental care are not known.

=== Vocalization ===
The spot-winged falconet's main call is a "distinctive nasal clucking constantly repeated, each note falling in pitch with a wailing effect"; it gives this when disturbed at the nest. The species also makes "a loud, guttural "kronk, kronk, kronk..."."

== Status ==
The IUCN has assessed the spot-winged falconet as being of Least Concern. It has a somewhat limited range and its population size is not known, but the latter is believed to be stable. No immediate threats have been identified. Its "[p]referred habitat is not among those most seriously devastated in the region."
