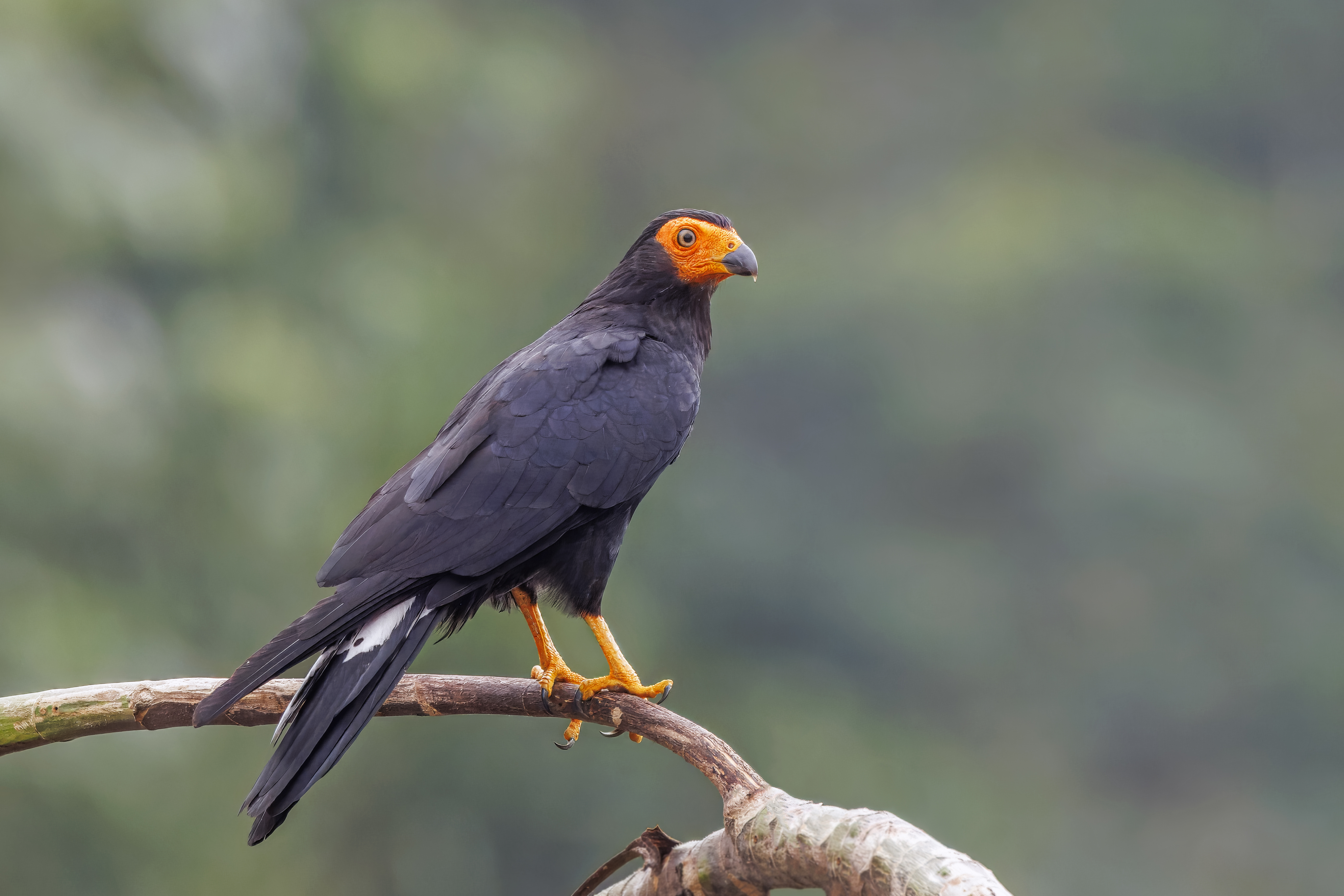
- Black caracara (Daptrius ater)

Scientific classification
- Kingdom: Animalia
- Phylum: Chordata
- Class: Aves
- Order: Falconiformes
- Family: Falconidae
- Subfamily: Polyborinae
- Genus: Daptrius; Vieillot, 1816

Type species
- Daptrius ater Vieillot, 1816

Synonyms
- Milvago Spix, 1824; Phalcoboenus d'Orbigny, 1834

= Daptrius =

Genus of birds

Daptrius is a genus of birds of prey in the family Falconidae comprising most of the caracaras. All members are endemic to South America, except for the yellow-headed caracara, which is also found in Costa Rica and Panama. The genus includes species previously placed in the genera Milvago and Phalcoboenus.

== Taxonomy ==
The genus Daptrius was introduced in 1816 by the French ornithologist Louis Vieillot to accommodate a single species, Datrius ater Vieillot, the black caracara. This is the type species. The genus name is from Ancient Greek δαπτης/daptēs meaning "bloodsucker" or "eater", from δαπτω/daptō meaning "to devour".

This genus now includes species that were formerly placed in the genera Milvago and Phalcoboenus. Molecular genetic studies found that Milvago was polyphyletic with the chimango caracara (Milvago chimango) sister to the genus Phalcoboenus and the yellow-headed caracara (Milvago chimachima) sister to Daptrius. As the genetic divergence was relatively shallow, the polyphyly was resolved by expanding the genus Daptrius to include the two other genera.

The genus contains seven species:

Image	Common name	Scientific name	Distribution
	Yellow-headed caracara	Daptrius chimachima (formerly in Milvago)	Costa Rica to north Argentina
	Black caracara	Daptrius ater	Amazonia
	Chimango caracara	Daptrius chimango (formerly in Milvago)	southern South America
	Carunculated caracara	Daptrius carunculatus (formerly in Phalcoboenus)	Ecuador and southwest Colombia
	Mountain caracara	Daptrius megalopterus (formerly in Phalcoboenus)	Peru to central Chile
	White-throated caracara	Daptrius albogularis (formerly in Phalcoboenus)	south Chile and south Argentina
	Striated caracara	Daptrius australis (formerly in Phalcoboenus)	Tierra del Fuego, Isla de los Estados (Staten Island), Navarino Island, and Falkland Islands

== Fossil species ==
- †Daptrius brodkorbi (Late Pleistocene of Peru)
- †Daptrius alexandri (Late Pleistocene of Hispaniola, West Indies)
- †Daptrius carbo, Cuban caracara (Holocene of Cuba, West Indies)
- †Daptrius diazfrancoi, Diaz Franco's caracara (Late Pleistocene of Cuba, West indies)

D. c. readei, a larger and stouter paleosubspecies of the yellow-headed caracara from the Late Pleistocene of Florida and possibly elsewhere, is also known.
