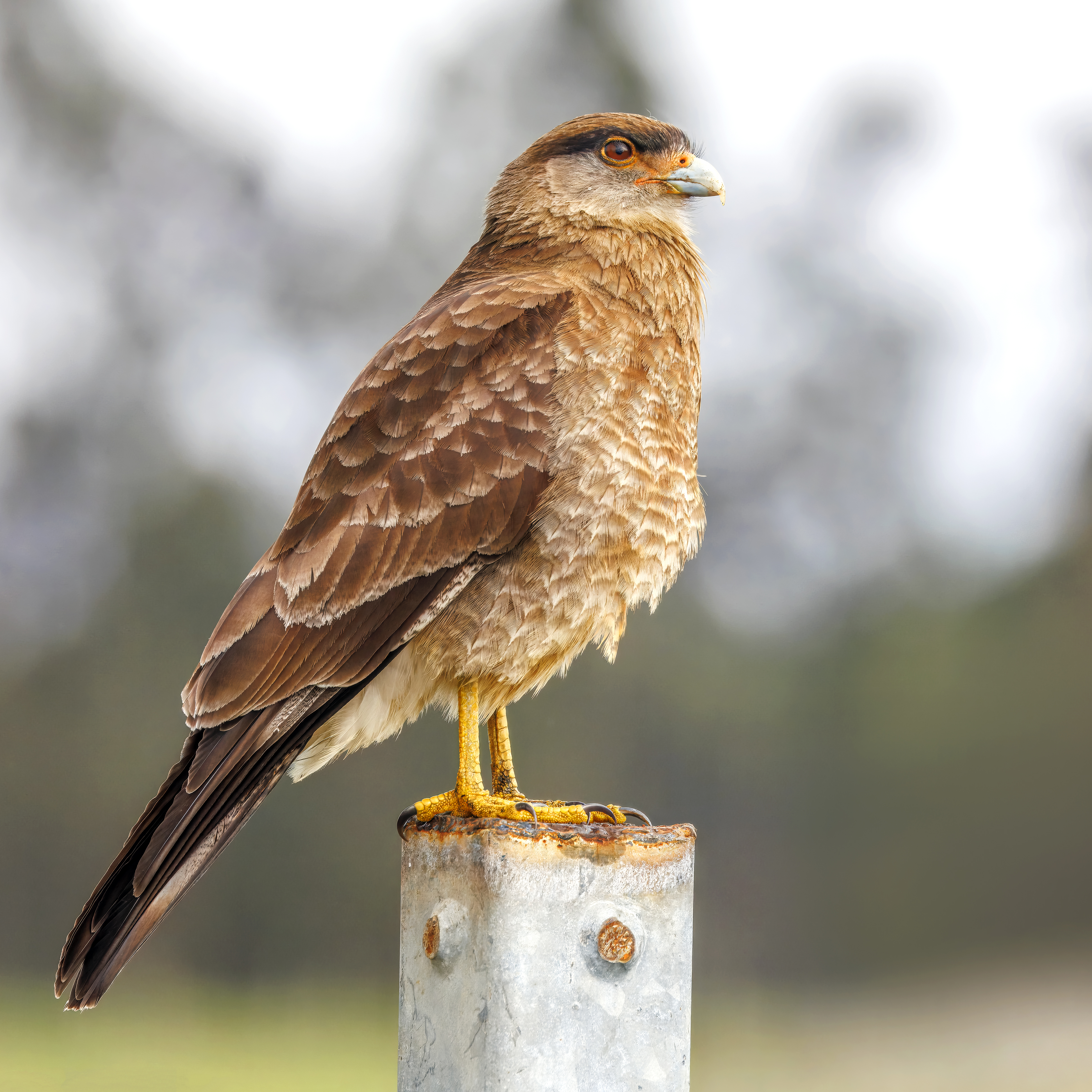
- Male D. c. temucoensis
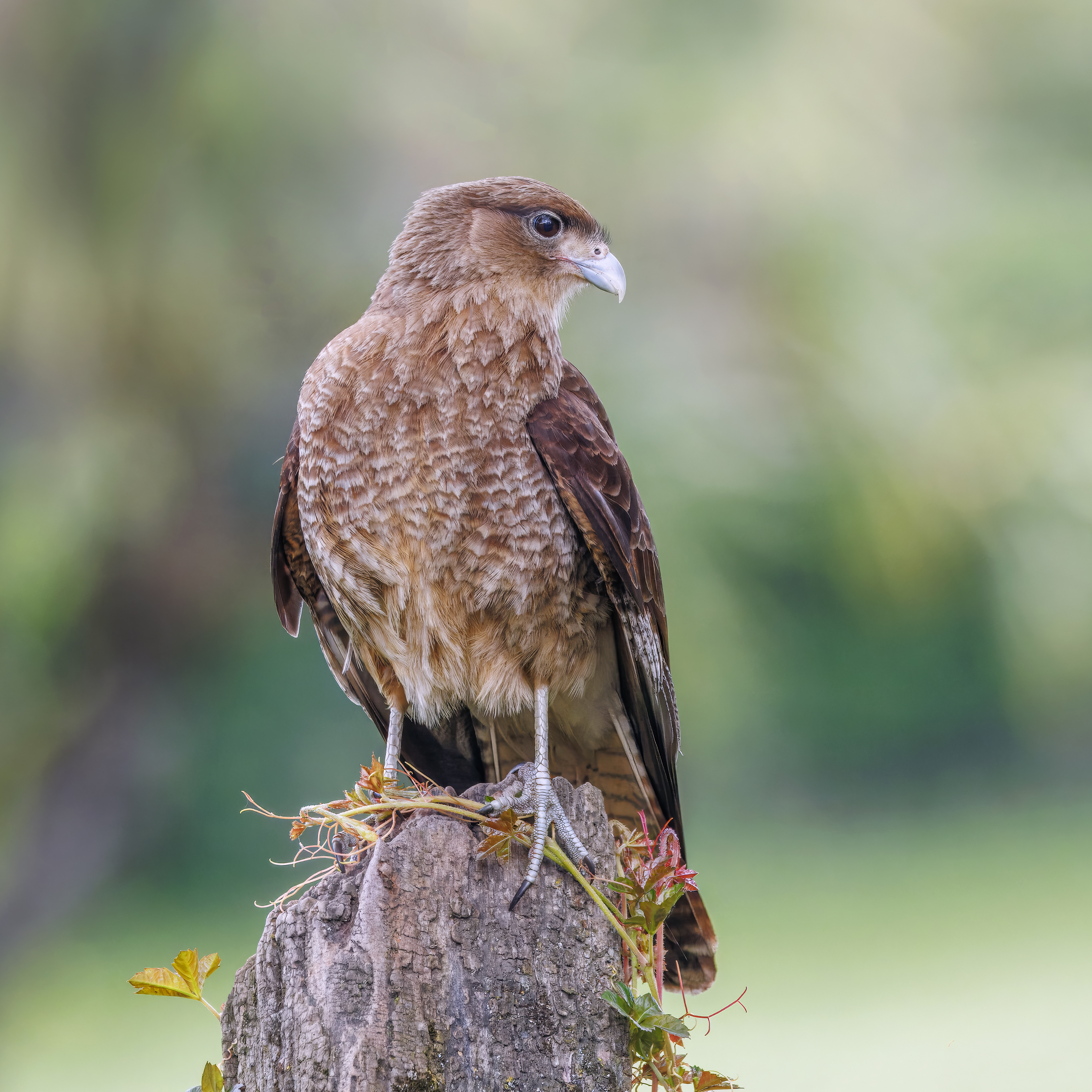
- Female D. c. temucoensis Vocalization

Conservation status
- Least Concern (IUCN 3.1)

Scientific classification
- Kingdom: Animalia
- Phylum: Chordata
- Class: Aves
- Order: Falconiformes
- Family: Falconidae
- Genus: Daptrius
- Species: D. chimango

Binomial name
- Daptrius chimango (Vieillot, 1816)

Synonyms
- Phalcoboenus chimango; Milvago chimango; Polyborus chimango Vieillot, 1816

= Chimango caracara =

Species of bird

The chimango caracara (Daptrius chimango), also known as chimango or tiuque, is a species of bird of prey in the family Falconidae, the falcons and caracaras. It is found in Argentina, Bolivia, Brazil, Chile, Paraguay, and Uruguay, as a vagrant on the Falkland Islands and has been introduced on Rapa Nui.

== Taxonomy and systematics ==
The chimango caracara was formally described in 1816 by French ornithologist Louis Vieillot under the binomial name Polyborus chimango. Vieillot based his account on the "Chimango" from Paraguay that had been described by the Spanish naturalist Félix de Azara in 1802. The specific epithet and the common name are from a local Argentinian onomatopoeia word "Chimango" for a caracara. The chimango caracara was formerly placed with the yellow-headed caracara in the genus Milvago. Molecular genetic studies found that Milvago was polyphyletic with the chimango caracara sister to the genus Phalcoboenus and the yellow-headed caracara sister to Daptrius. As the genetic divergence was relatively shallow, the polyphyly was resolved by expanding the genus Daptrius to include the two other genera.

=== Subspecies ===
Two subspecies are recognised:

- D. c. chimango (Vieillot, 1816) – forest of southern Brazil and Paraguay to central Argentina and central Chile
- D. c. temucoensis (Sclater, WL, 1918) – southern Chile and southern Argentina to Tierra del Fuego and Cape Horn Archipelago

The population in Tierra del Fuego has sometimes been proposed as a third subspecies, D. c. fuegiensis.

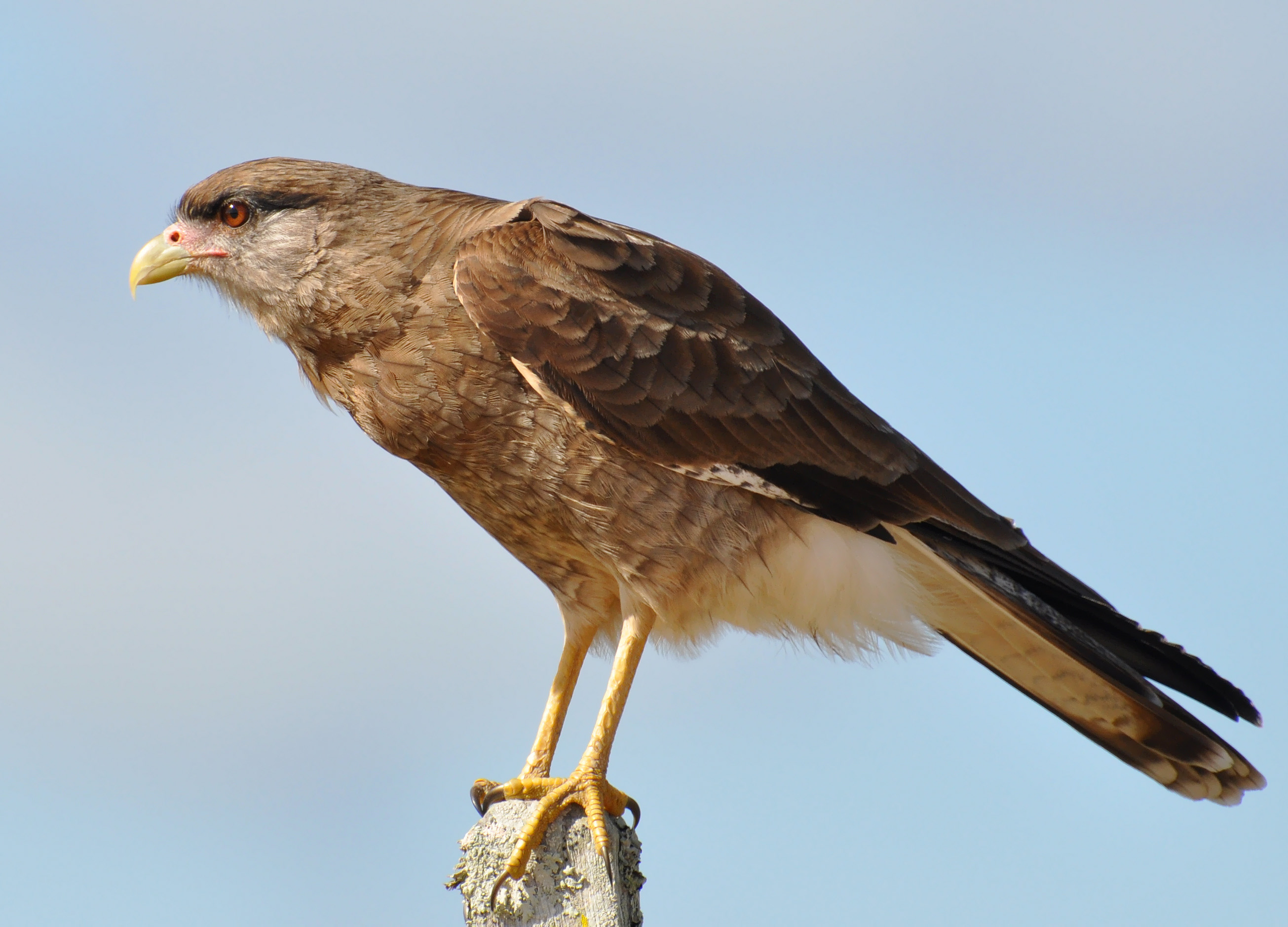
Male, Brazil

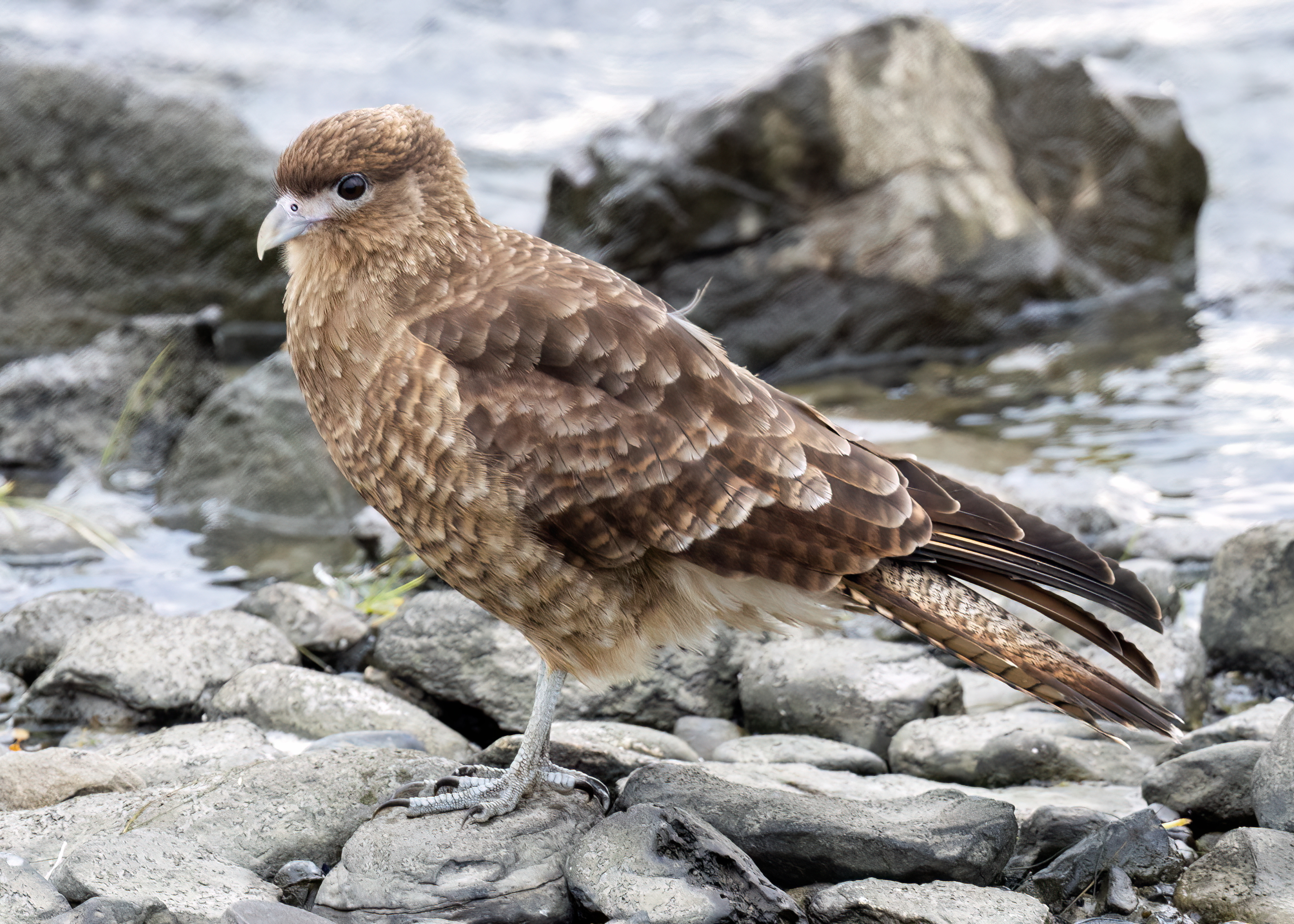
Female, Puerto Natales, Chile

== Distribution and habitat ==
The nominate subspecies of the chimango caracara is found in northern and central Chile and from central Argentina east through Paraguay, southern Brazil, and Uruguay to the Atlantic Ocean. It is also a non-breeding visitor north into Bolivia. Subspecies D. c. temucoensis is found from southern Chile at about Concepción Province and southern Argentina at about the Chubut River south through Tierra del Fuego to Cape Horn. Individuals have roamed to the Falkland Islands. In addition, the species was introduced to Easter Island in the early 20th century.

The chimango caracara inhabits a wide variety of open landscapes including grassy Andean foothills, heathland, shrub–steppe, and marshes. It also occurs in open woods, plantations, villages, suburban and urban areas, and coastal flats. In Argentina it is often found along roads and areas with a mix of pristine and disturbed plots. One author says it is most common in the ranching and wheat belt of the Argentinian Pampas, around Chilean fishing villages, around extensive marshlands, and at "rubbish dumps anywhere". It is the most common raptor in Argentinean Patagonia. In elevation it is most common below 2,000 m (6,600 ft) but is regularly found up to 3,000 m (9,800 ft) and occasionally as high as 4,000 m (13,000 ft).

== Description ==
The chimango caracara is 32 to 43 cm (13 to 17 in) long and weighs 170 to 260 g (6.0 to 9.2 oz). Its wingspan is 80 to 99 cm (31 to 39 in). The sexes' plumages are alike. Adults of the nominate subspecies are mostly brownish throughout. They have dark streaks on the side of the head and on their hindneck. Their undersides are mottled or barred with rufous-brown. Their uppertail coverts are white and their tail is mottled grayish and white with a wide black band near the end. Also, their iris is brown. Males have bare yellow skin around the eye and yellow legs and feet. Females have reddish-pink skin around the eye and bluish-gray legs and feet. Juvenile birds have a strong rufous tinge overall and bare parts colored like the adult females. Subspecies D. c. temucoensis is a darker smoky brown than the nominate, and their underparts are more heavily marked.

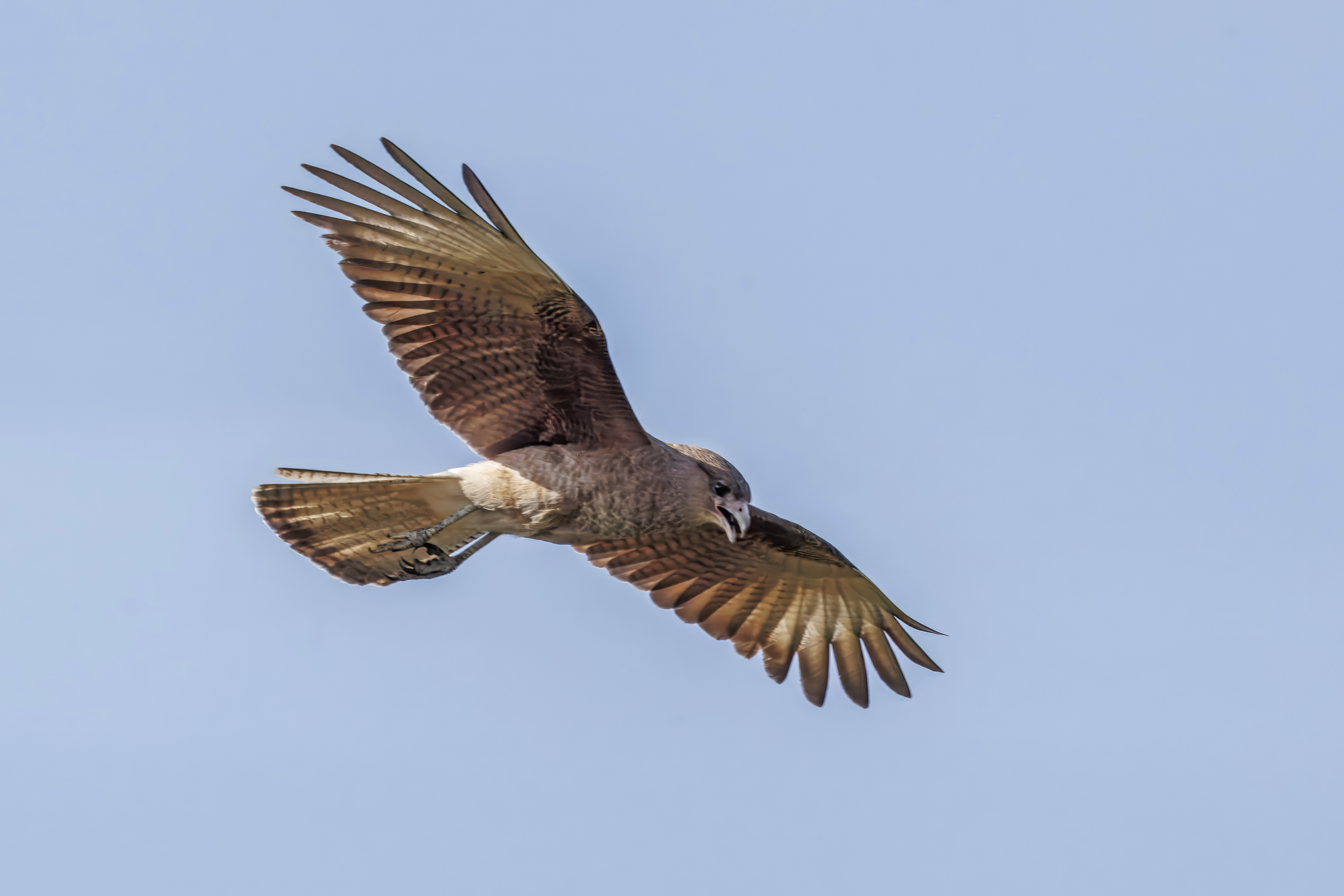
Female D. c. chimango
Colonia, Uruguay

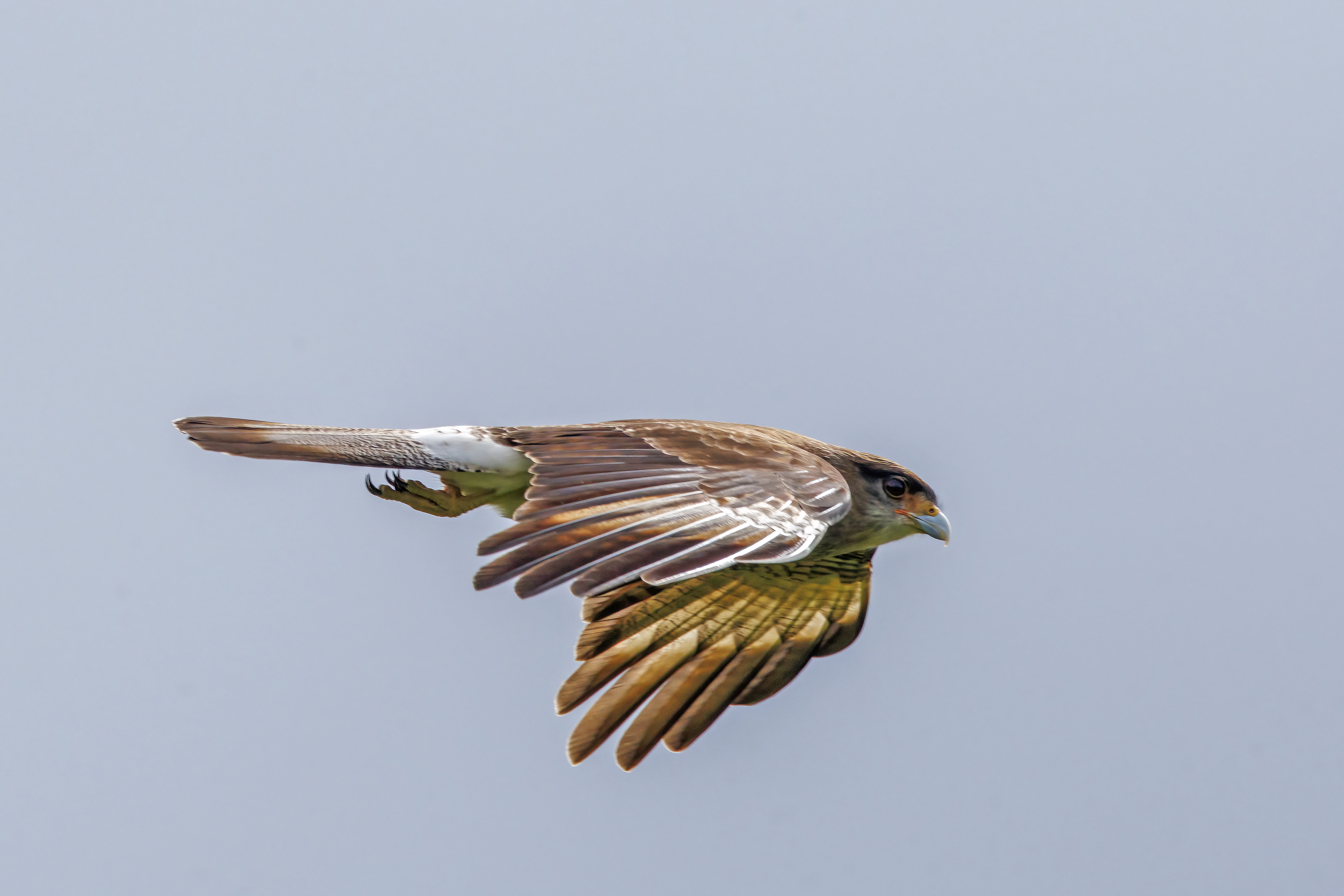
Male D. c. temucoensis
Chiloé Island, Chile

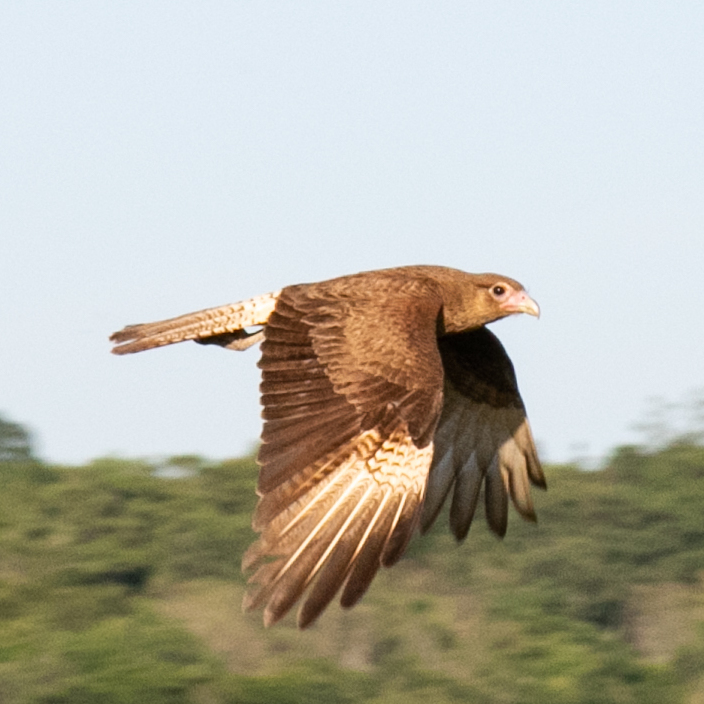
Female, in Argentina

== Behavior ==
=== Movement ===
The chimango caracara is a year-round resident in most of its range. Populations in the far south are partially migratory, with individuals moving north mostly in the austral winter. Members of the northern populations move into Bolivia in the non-breeding season and also in small numbers as far north in Brazil as Minas Gerais and Goiás. There are a few records from the Falkland Islands.

=== Feeding ===
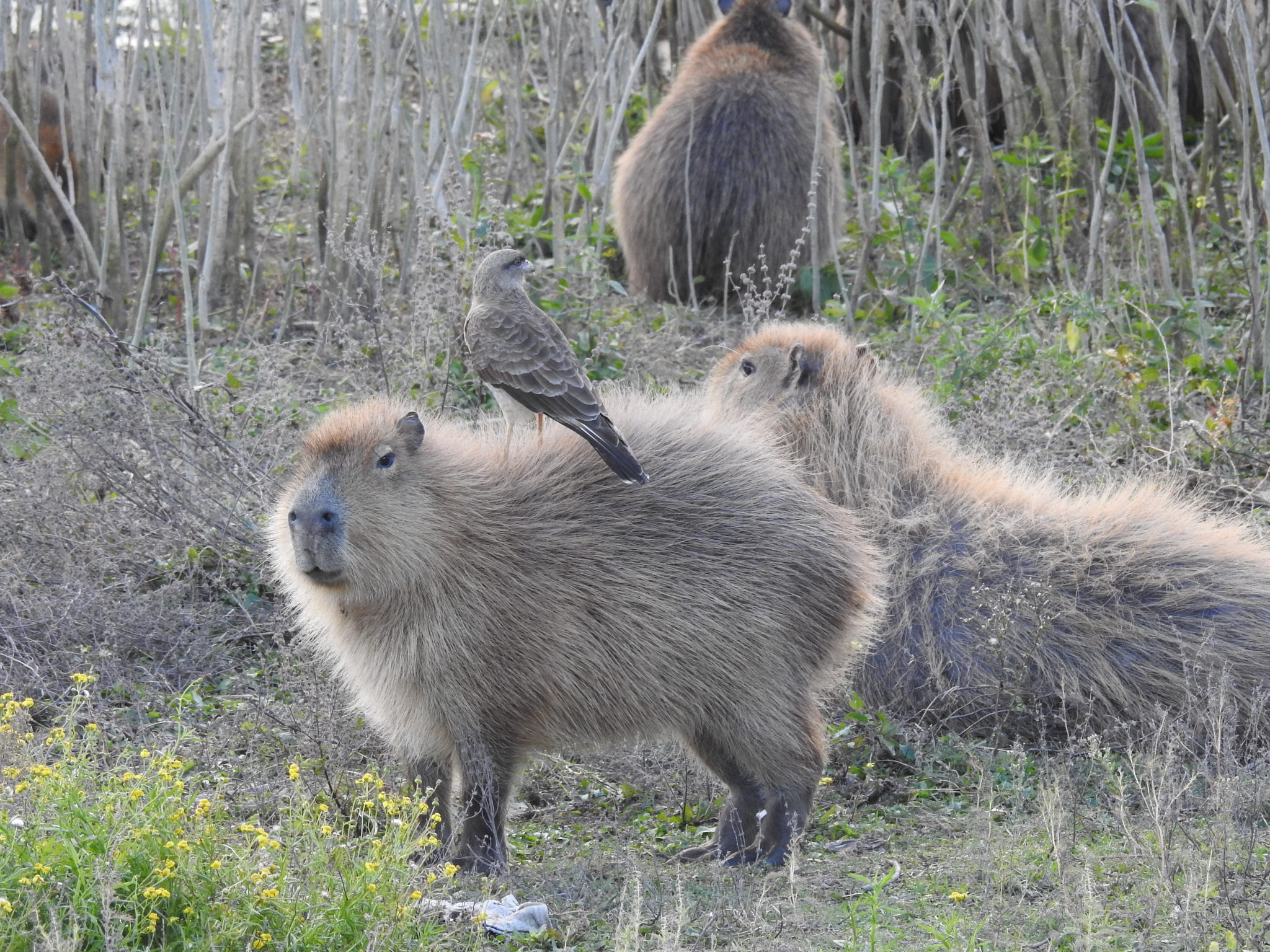
Perched on a capybara, in Buenos Aires. Chimango caracaras are known to feed on ticks on capybaras.

The chimango caracara is omnivorous, "a small-scale predator and general scavenger". Its live prey include insects and other invertebrates, lizards, amphibians, the eggs and young of other birds, and rodents. It scavenges small roadkill and also the carcasses of larger animals after other predators have left. It eats smaller amounts of vegetable matter like rotten apples, fungi, and what it can glean from horse and cattle dung. Furthermore, it typically forages on the wing, flying somewhat randomly up to 10 m (30 ft) above the ground and dropping onto prey or other food sources. It often follows farmers as they plow (assemblies of more than 100 birds have been observed), congregates at grass fires, and frequents fishing villages and shellfish processing plants for their waste. It pirates food from other raptors and large waterbirds. Individuals have been observed catching live fish from the surface of water.

=== Breeding ===
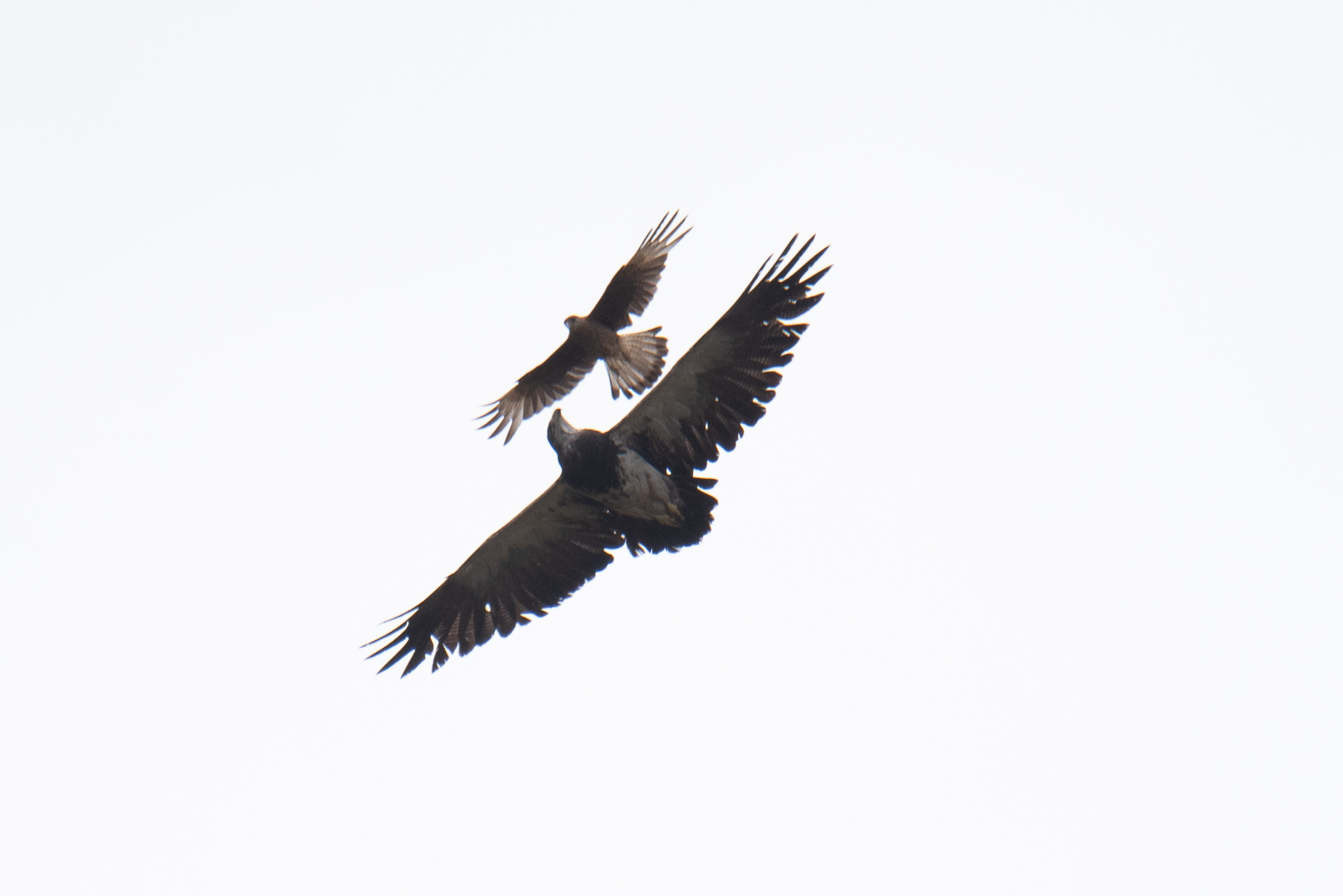
Harassing a black-chested buzzard-eagle, in Chile

The chimango caracara's breeding season spans September to January, with eggs laid from mid-October to mid-November in much of its range. It usually nests in trees, building a stick platform up to about 30 m (100 ft) above the ground, but much lower in Patagonia and oriented to avoid prevailing winds. In areas with few trees, it will nest on the ground or tussocks in a marsh. Tree nests of adjoining pairs are usually fairly far apart. Ground nesting can be colonial, for example, an observation of more than 70 nests in a 1.5 ha (3.7 acres) site. The clutch size is usually two or three eggs but up to five is not uncommon. The incubation period is 26 to 32 days and fledging occurs 32 to 41 days after hatch. Both sexes build the nest, incubate the clutch, and provision the young.

=== Cognitive behavior ===
The chimango caracara is an intelligent bird and has high problem-solving abilities compared to other birds. "The explorative tendency, low neophobia, and ability to innovate showed by D. chimango may be advantageous for this generalist and opportunistic raptor and might be some of the factors underlying its ecological success."

=== Vocalization ===
The chimango caracara is usually most vocal during the breeding season "particularly if human or other intruders [are] near nest", but also calls during disputes over food. Its most common call is a "loud petulant squealing keeeeee-eh" that is usually made singly and often in flight. It also makes a "more chattering ... keag-keah-keah ..." or "ke-ew, ke-ew, ke-ew" and a "variety of squeals, growls, and hissing whistles."

== Status ==
The IUCN has assessed the chimango caracara as being of Least Concern. It has a very large range, and though its population size is not known it is believed to be increasing. No immediate threats have been identified. "Currently thriving, perhaps benefitting in part from deforestation, and is the commonest raptor through much of Chile and Argentina."
