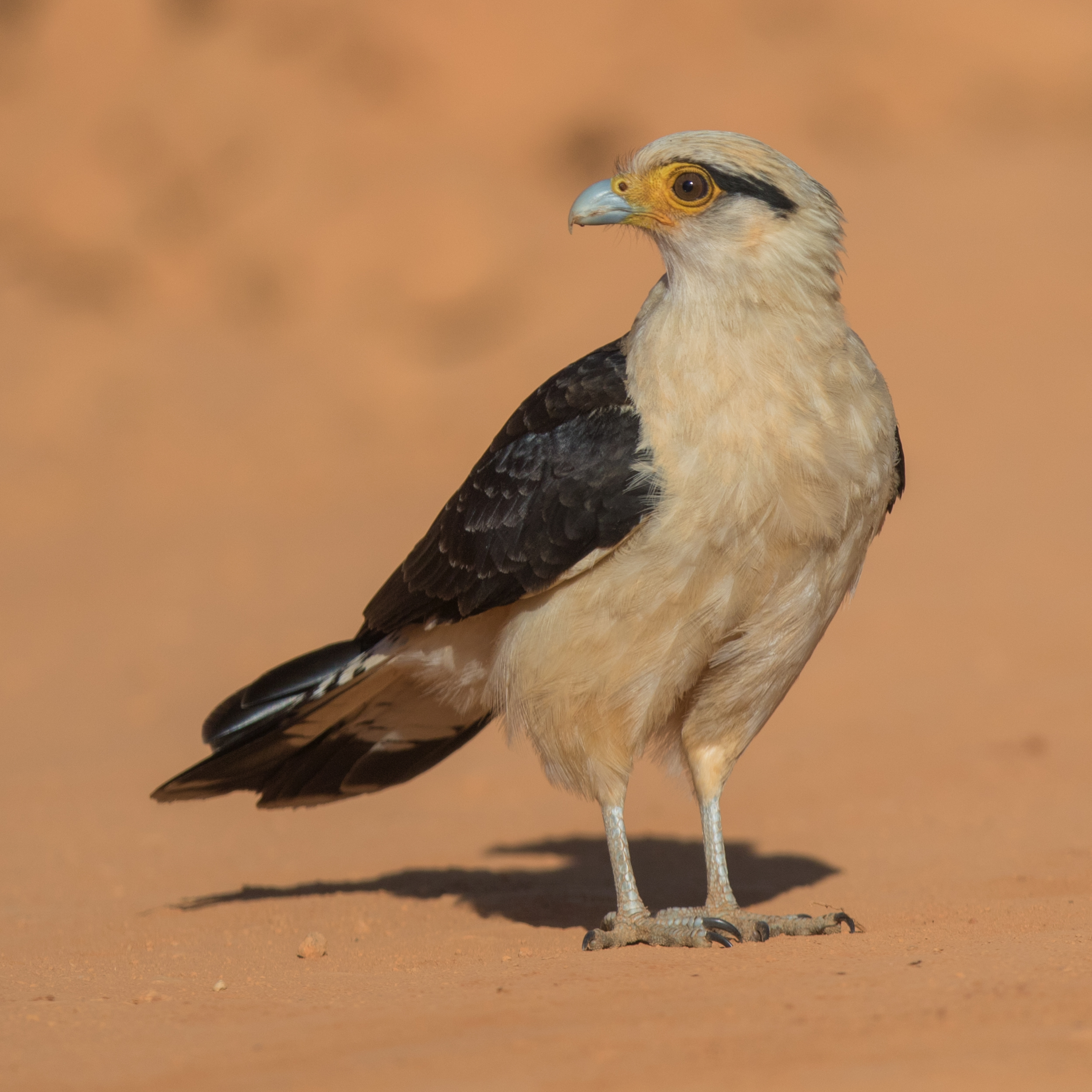
- Adult at Serra da Canastra National Park, Brazil

Conservation status
- Least Concern (IUCN 3.1)
- CITES Appendix II

Scientific classification
- Kingdom: Animalia
- Phylum: Chordata
- Class: Aves
- Order: Falconiformes
- Family: Falconidae
- Genus: Daptrius
- Species: D. chimachima

Binomial name
- Daptrius chimachima (Vieillot, 1816)

Synonyms
- Polyborus chimachima (Vieillot, 1816); Falco readei (Brodkorb, 1959); Milvago readei (Brodkorb, 1959)

= Yellow-headed caracara =

Species of bird

The yellow-headed caracara (Daptrius chimachima) is a new-world bird of prey in the family Falconidae, of the Falconiformes order (true falcons, caracaras and their kin). It can be found in North America and South America, from Nicaragua to Uruguay.

== Taxonomy and systematics ==
The yellow-headed caracara was formally described in 1816 by French ornithologist Louis Vieillot with the binomial name Polyborus chimachima. Vieillot based his account on the "Chimachima" from Paraguay that had been described by the Spanish naturalist Félix de Azara in 1802. The specific epithet is from a local Argentinian onomatopoeia word "Chimachima" for a caracara. The yellow-headed caracara was formerly placed with the chimango caracara in the genus Milvago. Molecular genetic studies found that Milvago was polyphyletic with the chimango caracara sister to the genus Phalcoboenus and the yellow-headed caracara sister to species in the genus Daptrius. As the genetic divergence was relatively shallow, the polyphyly was resolved by expanding the genus Daptrius to include the two other genera.

Two subspecies are recognised:

- D. c. cordatus (Bangs, O & Penard, TE, 1918) – savanna of southwestern Costa Rica through South America including Trinidad, to Brazil north of the Amazon River
- D. c. chimachima (Vieillot, 1816) – Brazil south of the Amazon River to eastern Bolivia, Paraguay, and northern Argentina

A larger and stouter paleosubspecies, D. c. readei, occurred in Florida, and possibly elsewhere, some tens of thousands of years ago, during the Late Pleistocene.

== Description ==
The yellow-headed caracara is 40 to 45 cm (16 to 18 in) long. Males weigh 277 to 335 g (9.8 to 12 oz) and females 307 to 364 g (11 to 13 oz). Their wingspan is 74 to 95 cm (29 to 37 in). The sexes' plumages are alike. Adults of the nominate subspecies have buff to creamy yellowish white heads, necks, and underparts with a thin dark streak through the eyes. Their back and wings are blackish brown with a whitish patch at the base of the primaries that shows in flight. Their uppertail coverts and tail are buff with dusky bars and the tail has a black band near the end. Their iris is reddish brown surrounded by bare bright yellow skin and their legs and feet are pea green. Immature birds have browner upperparts than adults and their underparts have brown streaks. Subspecies D. c. cordata is a darker buff on the head and underparts than the nominate and has narrower bars on the tail.

== Distribution and habitat ==
Subspecies D. c. cordata is found in southwestern Nicaragua, western Costa Rica, and most of Panama, and in mainland South America from Colombia east through Venezuela and the Guianas, south through Ecuador and Peru east of the Andes, and across Brazil north of the Amazon River. The Nicaragua records are only since 2008, and there are also scattered eBird records as far north as Guatemala and Belize. Off the north coast of the South American mainland, it occurs on Aruba, Trinidad, and Tobago, and has visited Bonaire and Curaçao as a vagrant. The nominate D. c. chimachima is found from eastern Bolivia south through Paraguay into northern Argentina and east through northern Uruguay and Brazil south of the Amazon River. Its range overlaps with that of the chimango caracara in southern Brazil, northern Argentina, Paraguay, and Uruguay.

The yellow-headed caracara is a bird of lightly treed open landscapes, like savannas with palms and scattered trees, ranchlands and pastures, gallery forests, and the edges of denser forests. In elevation, it mostly ranges from sea level to 1,000 m (3,300 ft), though it has been recorded at about 2,500 m (8,200 ft) in Colombia's Cauca River valley.

== Behavior ==
=== Movement ===
The yellow-headed caracara is generally sedentary, but records from northern Central America and islands off the north coast of South America indicate that individuals do wander. Within its usual range, it colonizes cleared areas.

=== Feeding ===
The yellow-headed caracara is omnivorous and relies heavily on scavenging. Its diet includes carrion, insects (adult and larval), crabs, fish, reptiles, amphibians, mammals, bird eggs and nestlings, horse dung, fruits such as those of oil palm (Elaeis guineensis), coconut, and maize, and seeds. It also takes ticks from cattle and other large mammals like capybaras and tapirs and enlarges open wounds. Much of its diet is taken while walking on the ground, but it does some hunting on the wing. It has also been observed to forage for small invertebrates in the fur of brown-throated three-toed sloths. Mixed-species feeding flocks apparently do not regard it as a threat, not making alarm calls during encounters.

=== Breeding ===
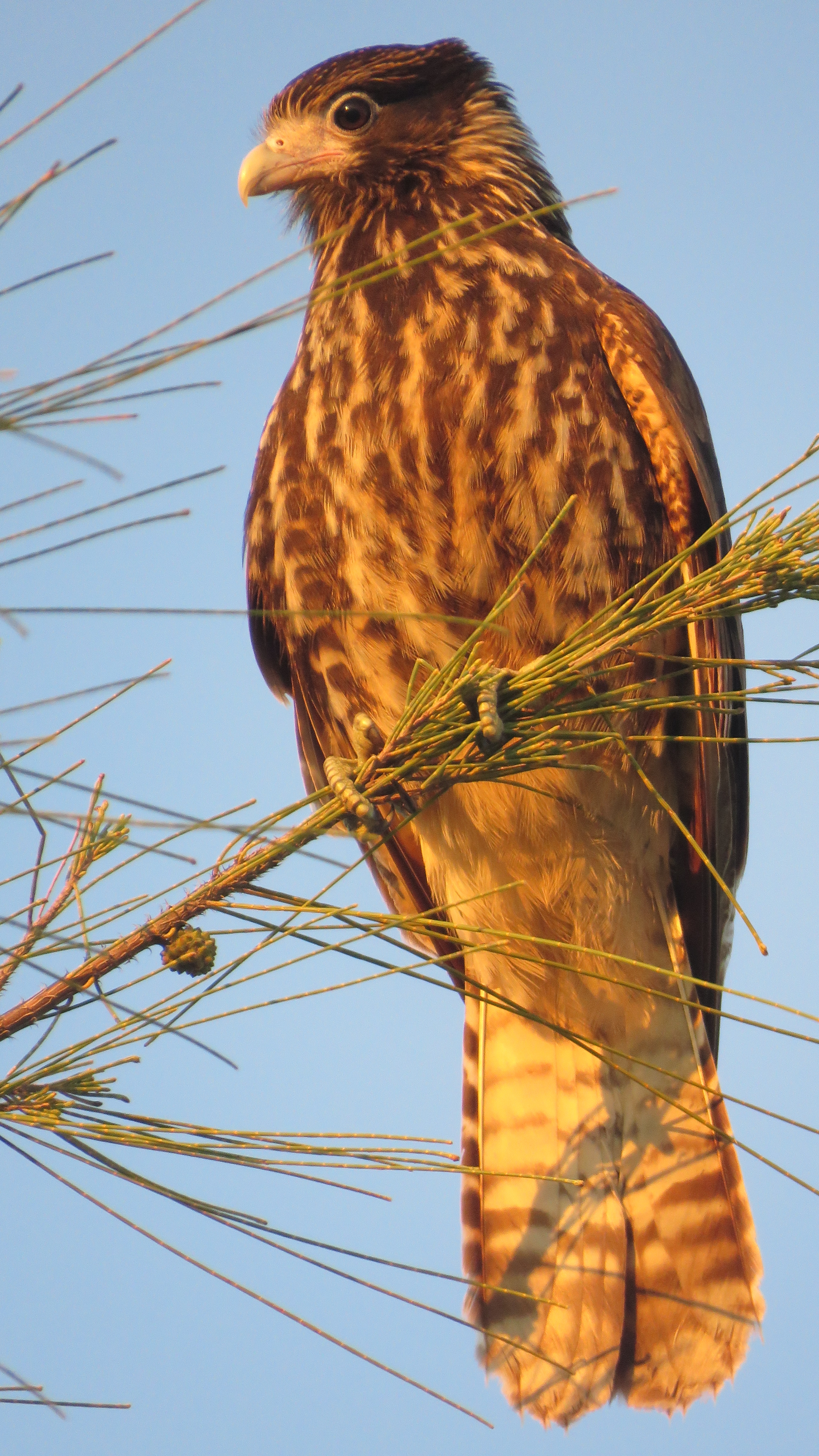
Juvenile seen in June in Santa Catarina, Brazil

The yellow-headed caracara's nesting season varies geographically. It spans from December to April in Costa Rica. In Colombia, there appear to be two seasons, January to April and July to September. It includes August in Venezuela. Egg laying has been recorded in May in Guyana, in July and August in central Brazil, and in September in southern Brazil. It usually builds a stick nest up to 15 m (50 ft) high in a tree or palm but has also nested in a tree cavity, and in the absence of trees on mounds in marshy areas, on the ground, and even in buckets and cans on the wall of a house. The clutch size has been reported as one or two eggs and also as four. The incubation period is about 22 days, fledging occurs 17 to 20 days after hatch, and young are dependent on the parents for about three more weeks. The female does most of the incubating but both parents provide the young.

=== Vocalization ===
The yellow-headed caracara is vocal mostly during the breeding season and also when quarreling over food. Its most common calls are a "scratchy wailing keeeah or a more drawn-out keeeeeeeee"; the calls are sometimes made singly but more often repeated. Other calls are a "more growling kraaa-kraaa-kraaa or krrrr-krrrr-krrrr; [a] piercing chay; and [a] thin hissing whistle, ksyeh, ksyeh."

== Status ==
The IUCN has assessed the yellow-headed caracara as being of Least Concern. It has an extremely large range and an estimated population of at least five million mature individuals that is believed to be increasing. No immediate threats have been identified. It "will certainly move into lowland areas as they are converted from forest to cattle ranches or to small- or to medium-scale farming."

== Gallery ==
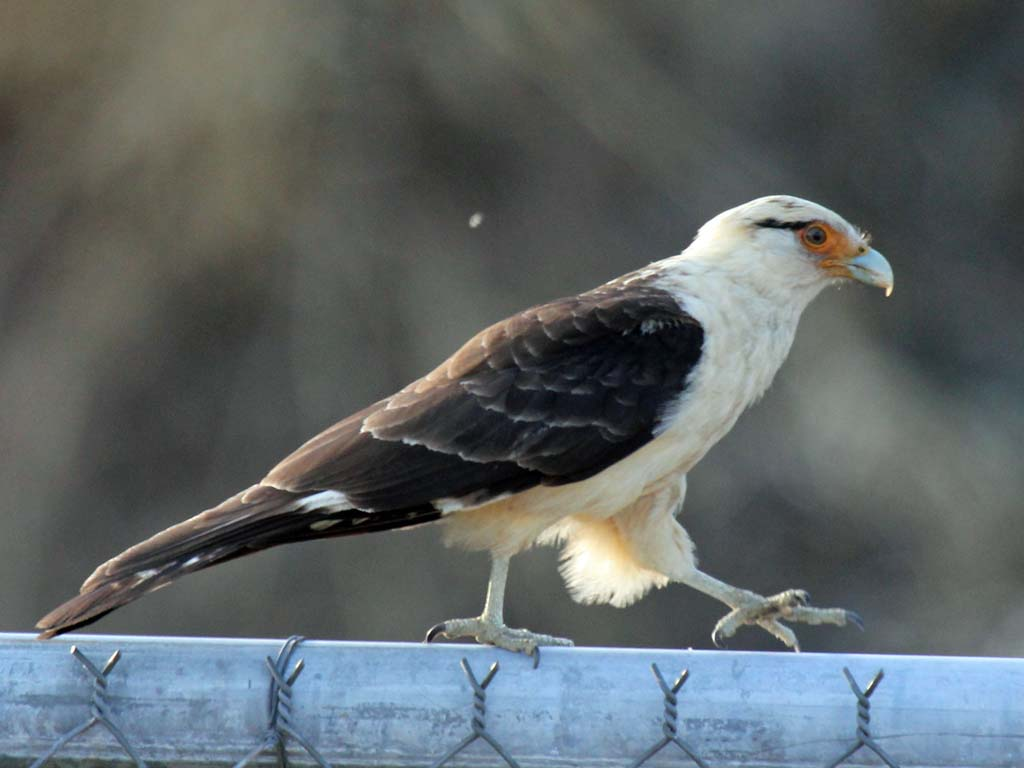
Adult in Panama

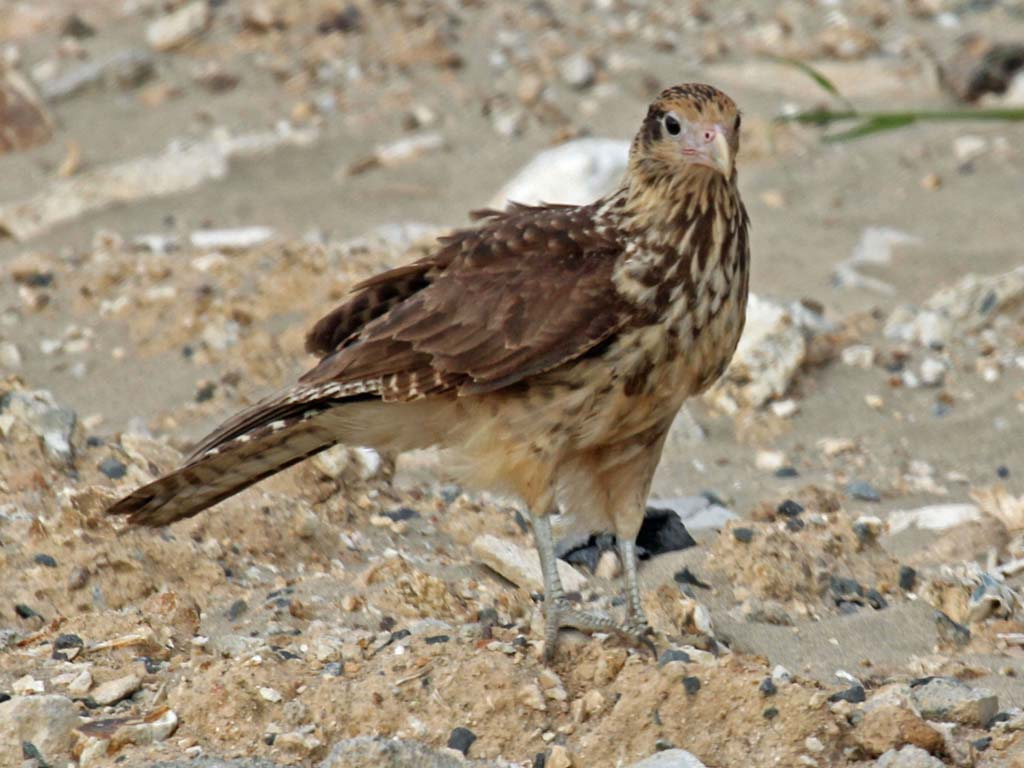
Juvenile in Panama

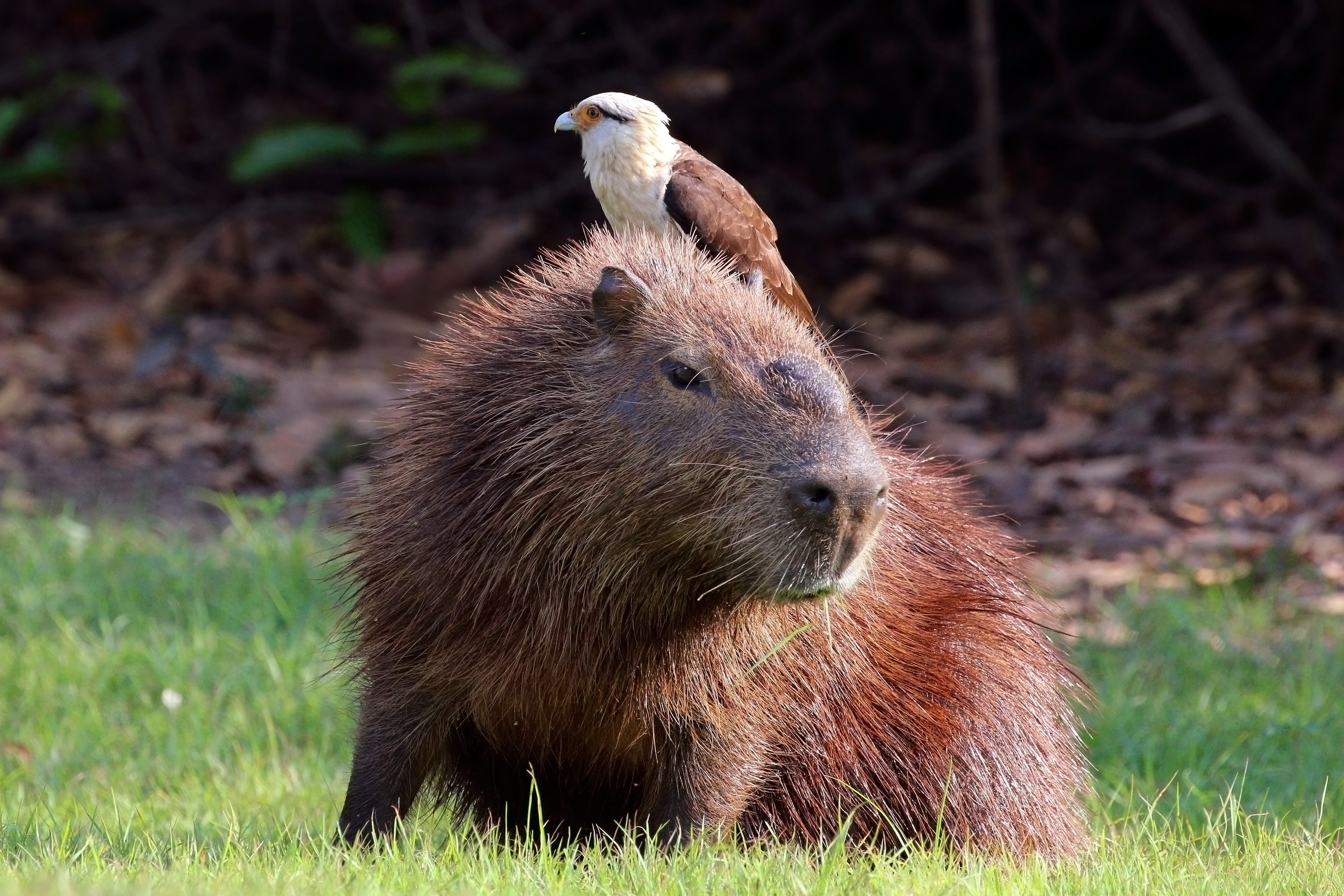
Adult on capybara (Hydrochoeris hydrochaeris), the Pantanal, Brazil

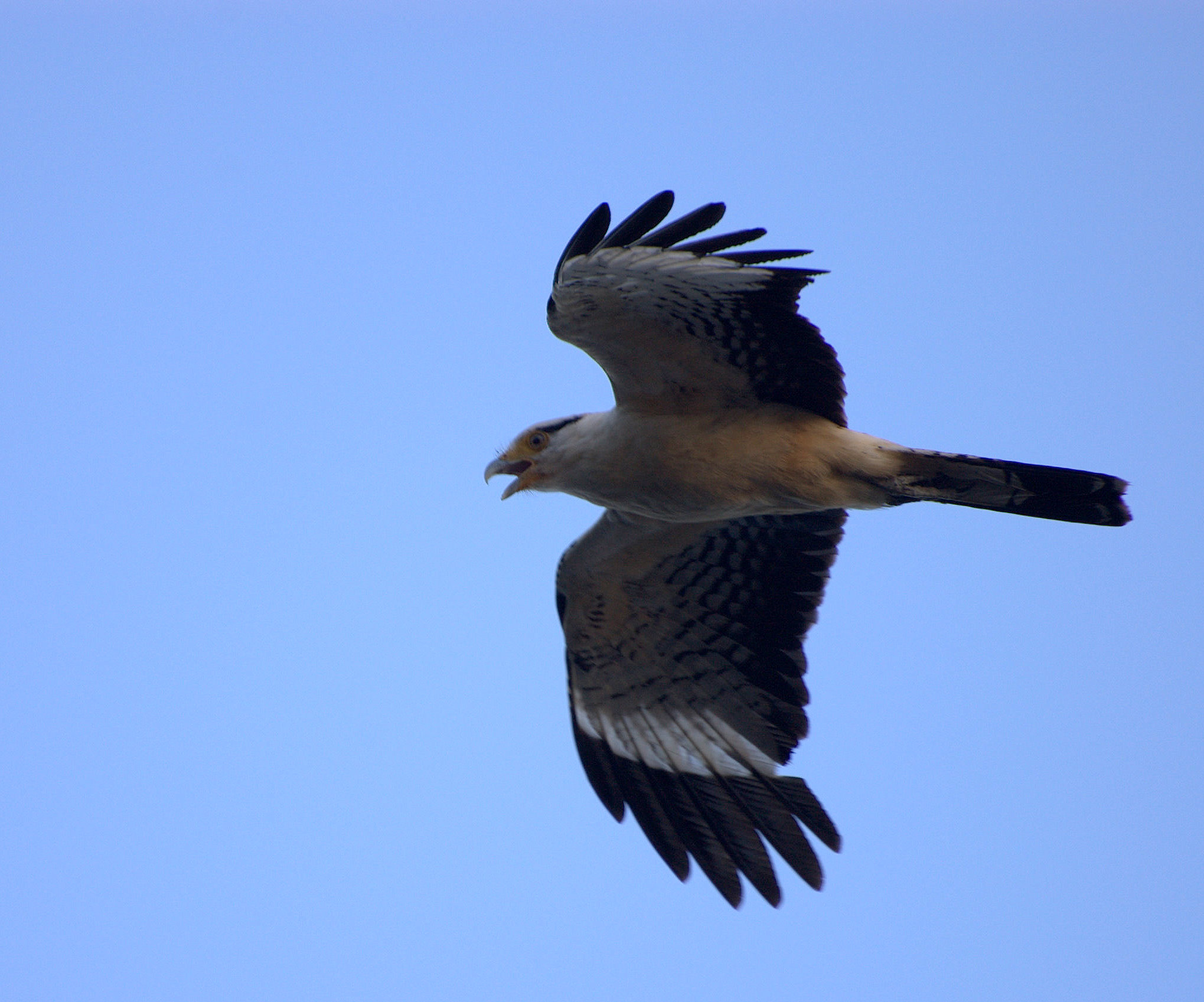
Among the most commonly seen birds of prey in Latin American cities

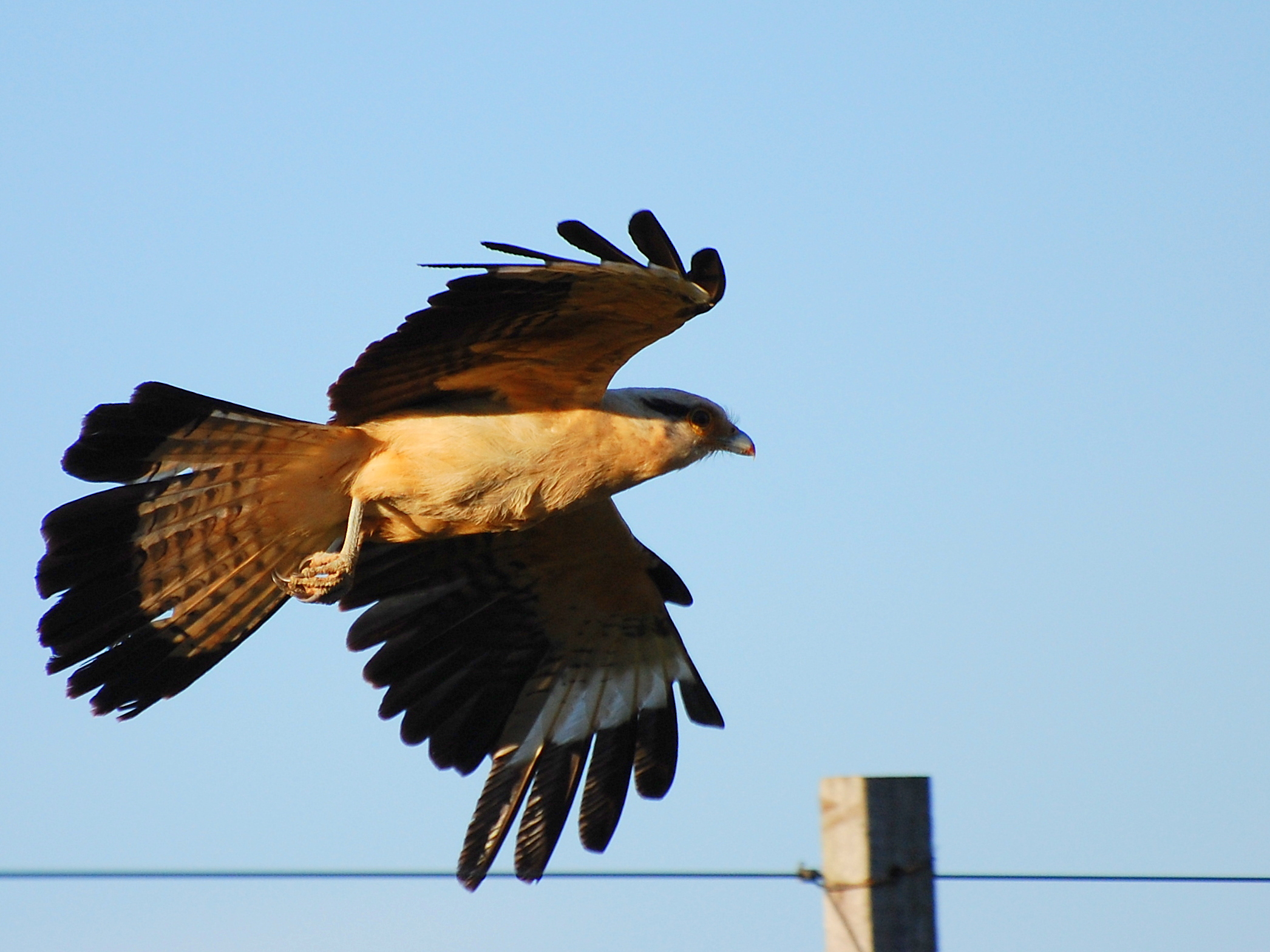

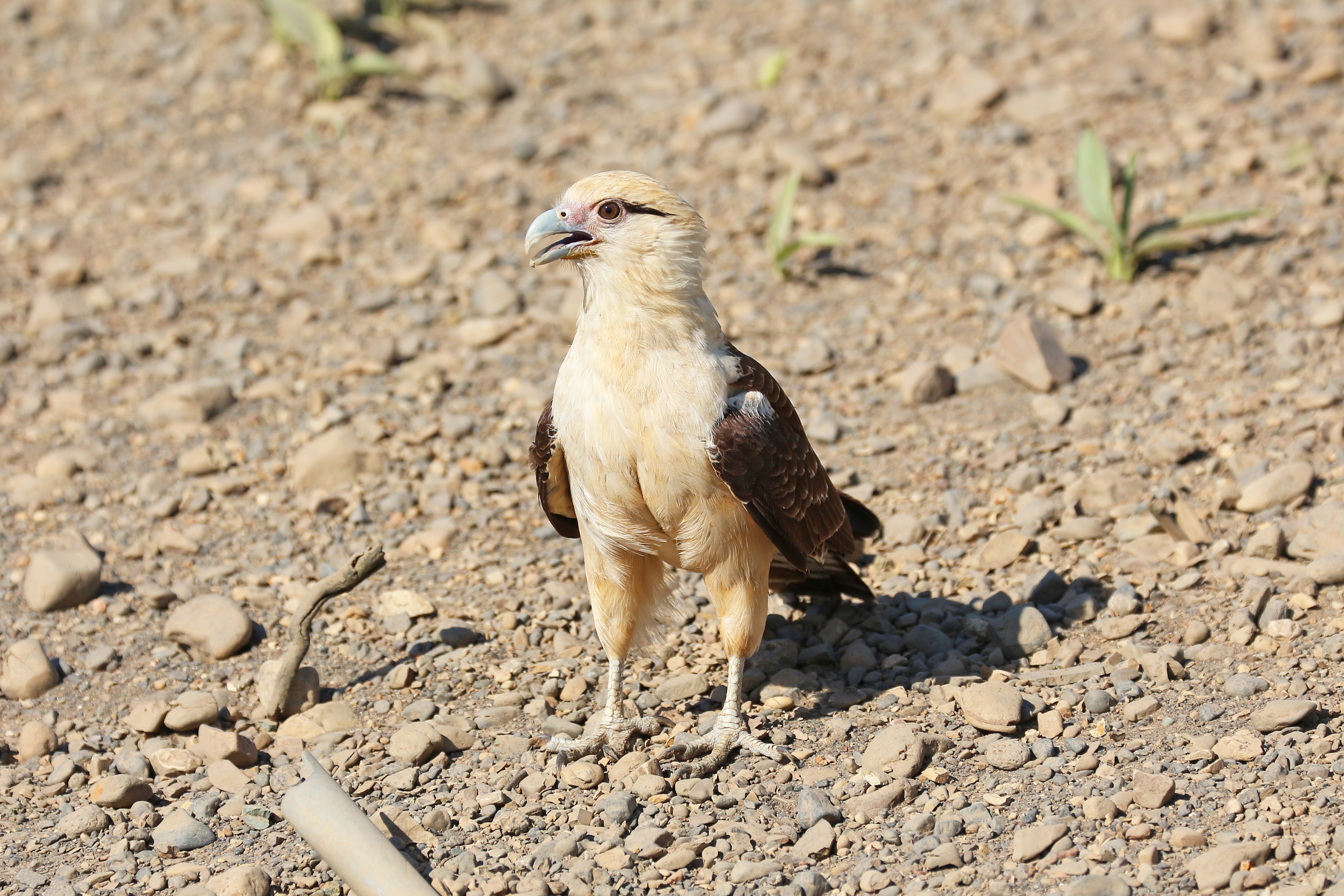
In Costa Rica
