= P. nigra =

P. nigra may refer to:

== Animals ==
- Penelopina nigra, the Highland guan, a bird species
- Petrotilapia nigra, a fish species
- Phelsuma v-nigra v-nigra, a small diurnal subspecies of geckos
- Phylidonyris nigra, a bird species that inhabits the east coast and the south-west corner of Australia
- Pomarea nigra, the Tahiti monarch, a bird species
- Porzana nigra, an extinct bird species

== Plants ==
- Phyllostachys nigra, a bamboo species
- Pinus nigra, a variable species of pine, occurring across southern Europe from Spain to the Crimea, and also in Asia Minor, Cyprus and locally in the Atlas Mountains of northwest Africa
- Populus nigra, the black poplar, a tree species
- Prosopis nigra, a South American leguminous tree species that inhabits the Gran Chaco ecoregion in Argentina and Paraguay
- Prunus nigra, a tree species native to eastern North America from New Brunswick west to southeastern Manitoba and south to Connecticut across to Iowa

== See also ==
- Nigra (disambiguation)
