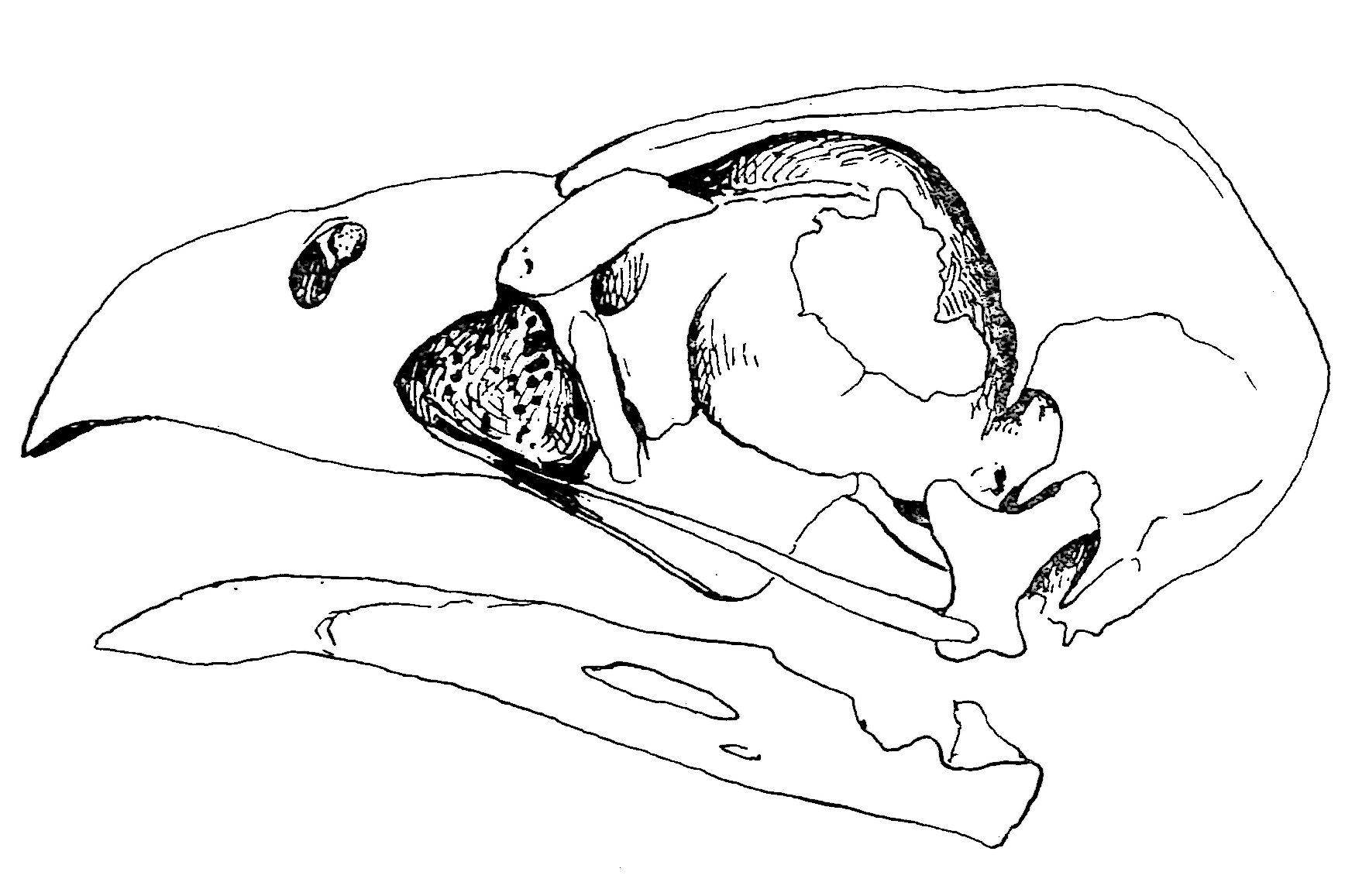

Conservation status
- Extinct (1903) (IUCN 3.1)

Scientific classification
- Kingdom: Animalia
- Phylum: Chordata
- Class: Aves
- Order: Falconiformes
- Family: Falconidae
- Genus: Caracara
- Species: †C. lutosa

Binomial name
- †Caracara lutosa (Ridgway, 1876)

Synonyms
- Polyborus plancus lutosus Caracara plancus lutosus Polyborus lutosus Caracara lutosus

= Guadalupe caracara =

Extinct species of bird

The Guadalupe caracara (Caracara lutosa) or mourning caracara is an extinct bird of prey belonging to the falcon family (Falconidae). It was, together with the closely related crested caracara (Caracara plancus), formerly placed in the genus Polyborus. It was also known as the quelili or the calalie.

== Description ==
The Guadalupe caracara was similar to the crested caracara, but differed in having less white on the upper breast and being barred on the belly rather than black.

== Distribution and taxonomy ==
This species inhabited Mexico's Guadalupe Island until the beginning of the 20th century. The crested caracara is sometimes incorrectly referred to as "Guadalupe caracara", because the extinct birds were formerly considered a subspecies of the extant taxon. They were reinstated as a full species in 2000.

== History ==
Described as "evil" and "vicious" by early observers, it was driven to extinction by a hunting and poisoning campaign led by goat herders on Guadalupe Island. As described by Edward Palmer:

The "Calalie" is abundant on every part of the island; and no bird could be a more persistent or more cruel enemy of the poultry and domestic animals. It is continually on the watch, and in spite of every precaution often snatches its prey from the very doors of the houses. The destruction of the wild goats is not so great, as these animals are better able to protect themselves than the tame ones. No sooner is one kid born - while the mother is in labor with the second - than the birds pounce upon it; and should the old one be able to interfere, she is also assaulted. No kid is safe from their attacks. Should a number be together, the birds unite their forces, and, with great noise and flapping of their wings, generally manage to separate the weakest one and dispatch it. They sometimes fasten upon the tongue when the poor creature opens its mouth to bleat, and have been known to tear it out, leaving the animal to perish, if not otherwise destroyed. Sometimes the anus is the point of first attack. The birds are cruel in the extreme, and the torture sometimes inflicted upon the defenceless animals is painful to witness... Even when food is plenty, they often attack living animals instead of contenting themselves with the carcasses of those already dead, seeming to delight in killing. Should one of their number be disabled or wounded, it is instantly dispatched by the rest.

— Edward Palmer, in Errol Fuller, Extinct Birds

== Conservation ==
In 1876 the species was common throughout the island. However, in March 1897, only one bird was encountered, but additional members of the species survived. On 1 December 1900 collector Rollo Beck encountered 11 and preserved nine as scientific specimens. He may have shot the last of the caracaras on Guadalupe Island, believing from their fearlessness and ease of finding them that they were common. There was one more (unconfirmed) sighting in 1903; the bird was certainly gone by 1906.

The Guadalupe caracara is one of the few species that were intentionally rendered extinct by humans. In its particular case, it was demanded by goat farmers that the birds were to be killed off as they occasionally fed on young goats (though the role of the caracara as a predator of goats was much exaggerated). It stands to note that its erstwhile home was at that time being devastated by tens of thousands of goats gone feral, leading to the extinction of several endemic species caused by the near-total destruction of habitat.

In an apparent case of coextinction, the ischnoceran louse Acutifrons caracarensis is only known from the Guadalupe caracara.

Around 35 specimens (skins, skeletons and two eggs) remain in public collections today. Specimens are available for display in Chicago, Washington, and London.
