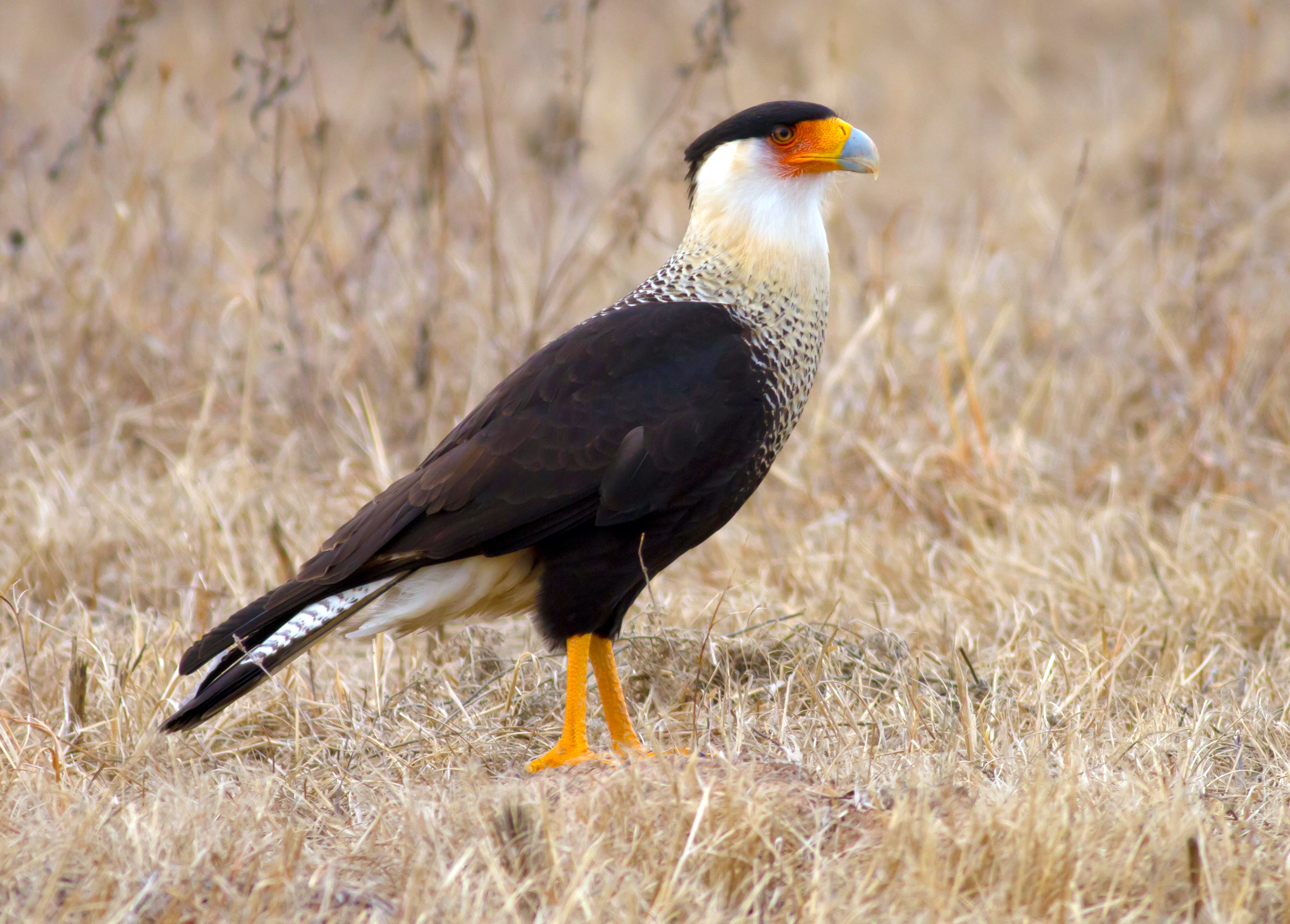
- Crested caracara (Caracara plancus)

Scientific classification
- Kingdom: Animalia
- Phylum: Chordata
- Class: Aves
- Order: Falconiformes
- Family: Falconidae
- Subfamily: Polyborinae
- Genus: Caracara; Merrem, 1826

Type species
- Vultur plancus Miller, JF, 1777

Species
- Caracara plancus; †Caracara lutosa; and see text

Synonyms
- Polyborus

= Caracara (genus) =

Genus of birds

Caracara is a genus in the family Falconidae and the subfamily Polyborinae. It contains one extant species, the crested caracara, and one recently extinct species, the Guadalupe caracara. The crested caracara had in recent years been split into a northern species C. cheriway and a southern species C. plancus, but the South American Classification Committee of the American Ornithological Society has voted to again merge the two, retaining C. plancus as the crested caracara. The taxonomists of the International Ornithologists' Union have also merged them.

== Appearance ==
The crested caracara is distinguished by its long legs and medium size. The birds can reach a length of 49–58 cm (19–23 in) from head to tail. There are usually four points of identification of the caracara: strikingly white markings on the neck, the tip of both wings, and the tail. Along with their medium length, the caracara also has a wingspan of 122–129 cm (48–51 in). When flying, the caracara is often noted to have a pattern on their underside that looks like a cross.

== Behavior ==
The behaviors of caracaras are considered quite strange in relation to those of other falcons. The bird is often seen walking on the ground in search of prey. In addition to a preference of walking over flying, the birds also create close bonds with their mates. Caracaras are territorial creatures who are year-round landlords of trees and land that they occupy. Their aggression is an extension of this, which is why they have been seen taking food from much larger creatures like vultures. In flight, this bird is known for having very direct flight. It does not soar for leisure.

== Taxonomy and fossil record ==
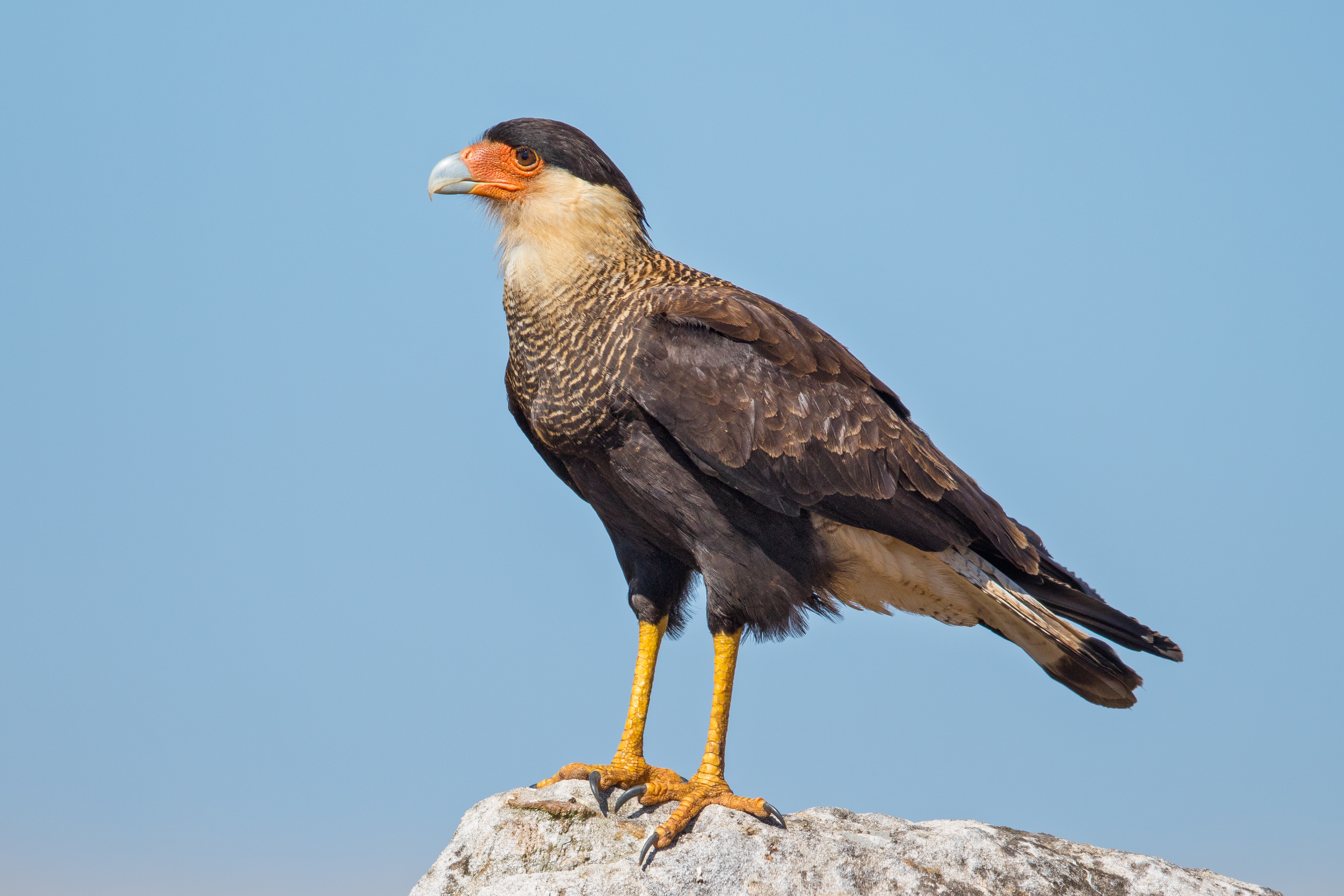
Caracara plancus

The crested caracara is the only extant species in Caracara, and was formerly separated into two species, the northern and southern crested caracaras. The modern range includes Cuba, South America, most of Central America and Mexico, just reaching the southernmost parts of the United States, including Florida and Southeast Texas.

- †Guadalupe caracara (Caracara lutosa) – extinct (1900)

Native to Guadalupe Island off the west coast of Baja California, the Guadalupe caracara was hunted to extinction by 1906.

An additional six species have been described on the basis of fossil and subfossil records:

- †Caracara creightoni – Late Pleistocene (Cuba, The Bahamas)
- †Caracara latebrosus – Late Pleistocene (Puerto Rico)
- †Caracara major - Late Pleistocene (Uruguay)
- †Caracara prelutosus – Late Pleistocene (Rancho La Brea, San Miguel Island, California)
- †Caracara seymouri – Late Pleistocene (Peru, Ecuador)
- †Caracara tellustris – Late Pleistocene (Jamaica)

An unnamed Late Pleistocene species of Caracara from Argentina was the largest falcon ever, with a minimum weight estimate of around 4.5 kilograms (9.9 lb).
