= Grand Comoro day gecko =

Grand Comoro Day Gecko

Scientific classification
- Domain: Eukaryota
- Kingdom: Animalia
- Phylum: Chordata
- Class: Reptilia
- Order: Squamata
- Infraorder: Gekkota
- Family: Gekkonidae
- Genus: Phelsuma
- Species: P. v-nigra
- Subspecies: P. v. comoraegrandensis

Trinomial name
- Phelsuma v-nigra comoraegrandensis Meier, 1986

Subspecies of lizard

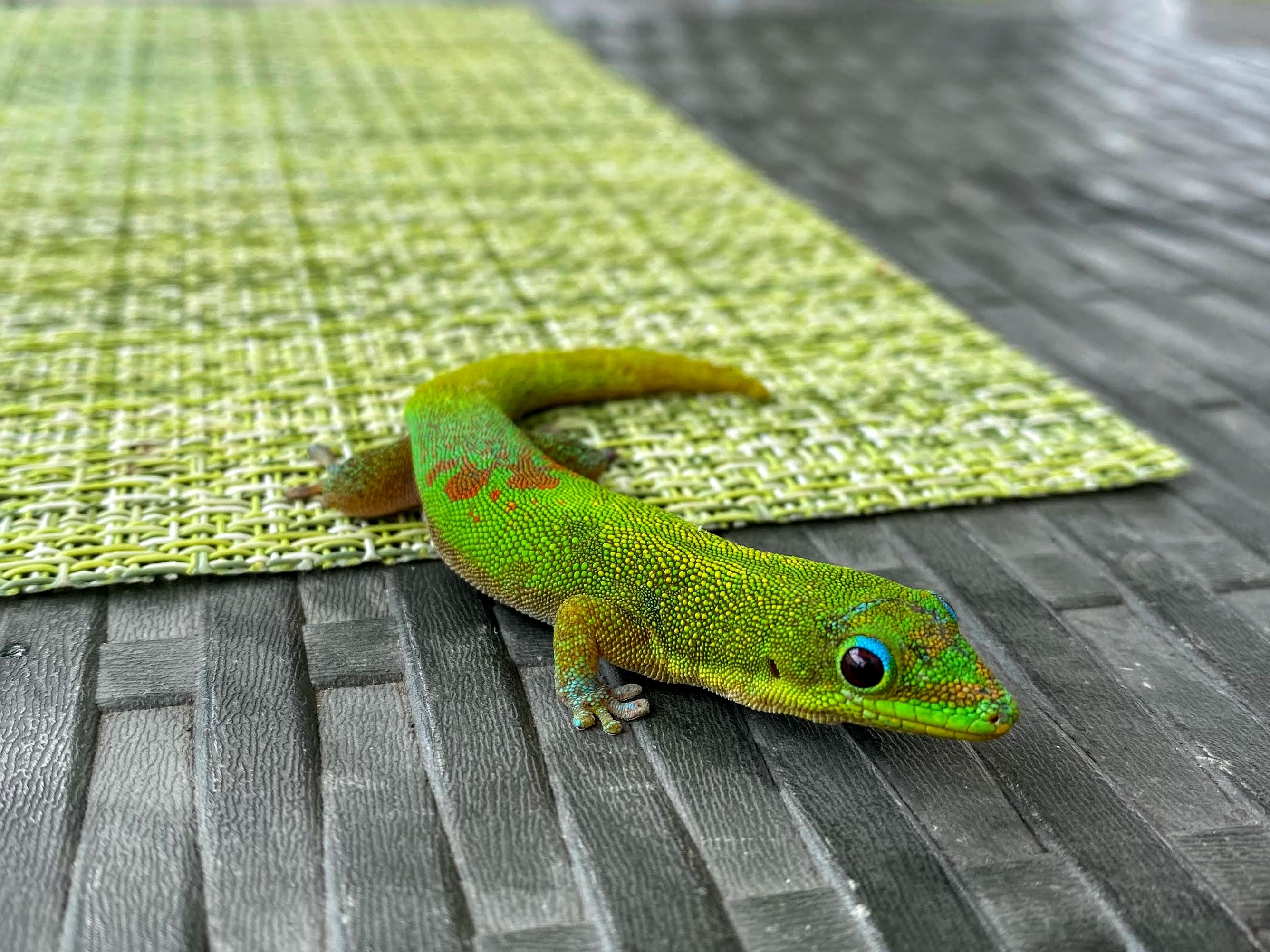
Comoros Day Gecko - Right

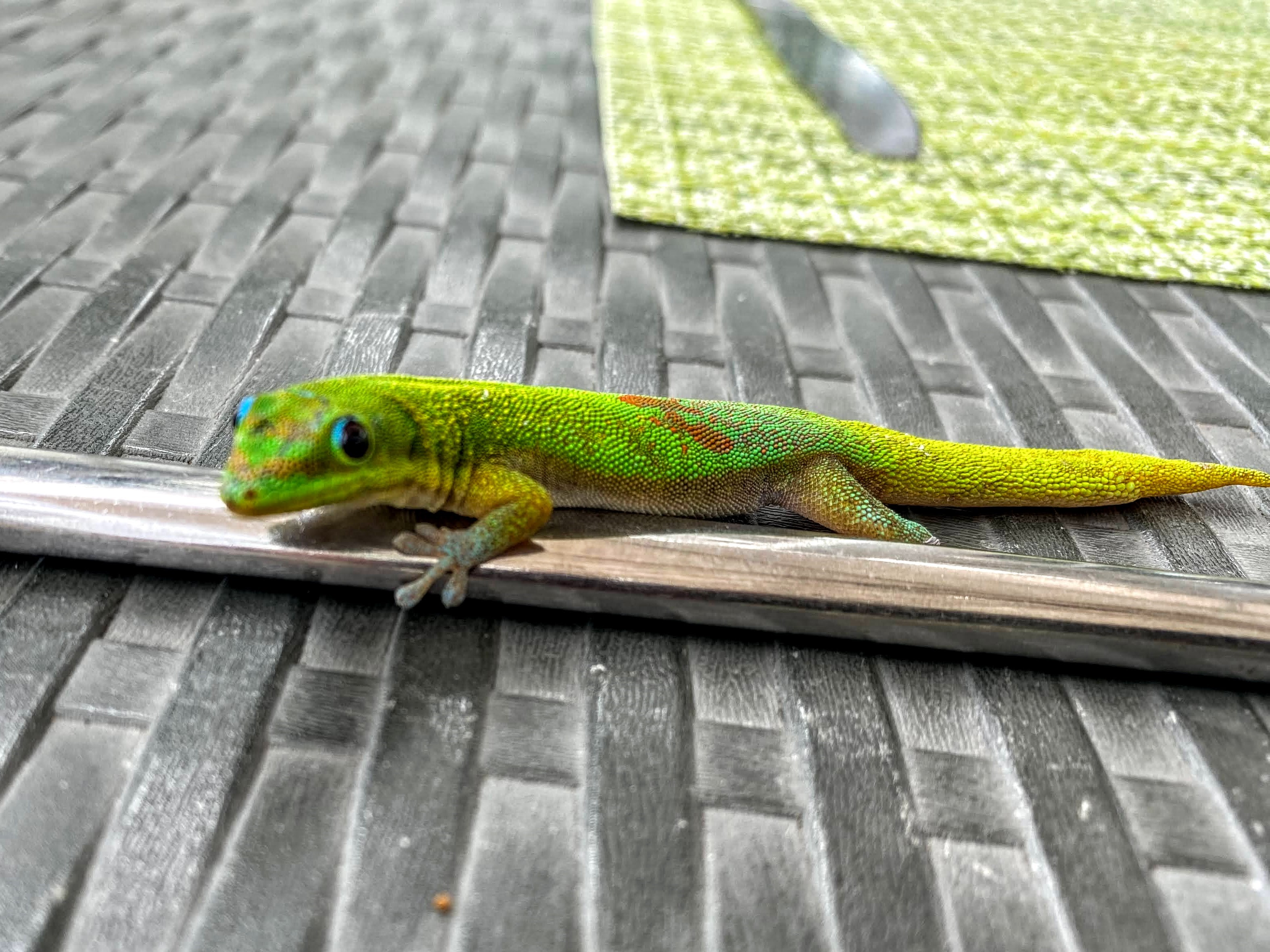
Comoros Day Gecko - Left

The Grand Comoro Day Gecko (Phelsuma v-nigra comoraegrandensis Meier, 1986) is a small diurnal subspecies of geckos. It lives in the Comoros and typically inhabits trees and bushes. The Grand Comoro day gecko feeds on insects and nectar.

== Description ==
This lizard belongs to the smallest day geckos. It can reach a maximum length of approximately 10 cm. Their bodies are bright green, which may have a blue hue. There is a red v-shaped stripe on the snout and two red bars between the eyes. On the back there often are a large number of small red-brick coloured dots which may form a faint mid dorsal stripe. The flanks are grey. There is a v-shaped marking on the throat. The ventral side is yellowish white. This lizard also does not have eyelids like all day geckos.

== Distribution ==
This species only inhabits the island Grand Comoro in the Comoros.

== Habitat ==
The Grand Comoro day gecko inhabits moist forests, palm trees and human dwellings.

== Diet ==
These day geckos feed on various insects and other invertebrates. They also like to lick soft, sweet fruit, pollen, and nectar.

== Reproduction ==
At a temperature of 28°C, the young will hatch after approximately 45 days. The juveniles measure 35 mm.

== Care and maintenance in captivity ==
These animals should be housed in pairs and need a medium-sized, well planted terrarium. The daytime temperature should be between 28 and 30 °C and 24 and 26 °C at night. The humidity should be around 75–90%. In captivity, these animals can be fed with crickets, wax moth larvae, fruit flies, mealworms, and houseflies.
