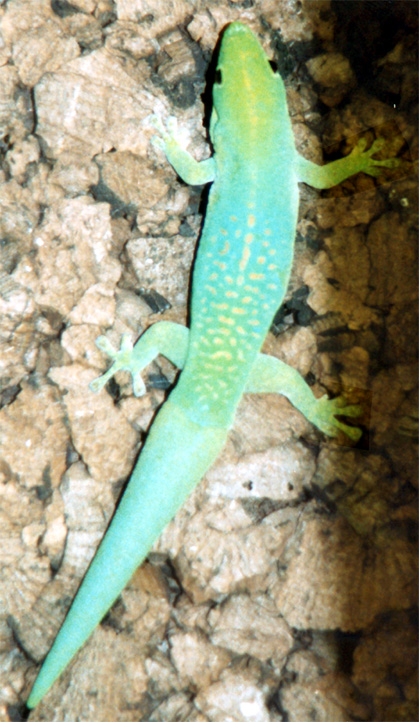

Conservation status
- Least Concern (IUCN 3.1)

Scientific classification
- Domain: Eukaryota
- Kingdom: Animalia
- Phylum: Chordata
- Class: Reptilia
- Order: Squamata
- Infraorder: Gekkota
- Family: Gekkonidae
- Genus: Phelsuma
- Species: P. v-nigra

Binomial name
- Phelsuma v-nigra Boettger, 1913

Synonyms
- Phelsuma nigra Boettger, 1913; Phelsuma nigra nigra Boettger, 1913; Phelsuma nigra anjouanensis Meier, 1986; Phelsuma nigra comoraegrandensis Meier, 1986

= Phelsuma v-nigra =

Species of lizard

Phelsuma v-nigra, also known as the Indian day gecko or Boettger's day gecko, is a species of gecko. It is endemic to the Comoros.

== Subspecies ==
There are three subspecies:

Image	Subspecies	Common name
	Phelsuma v-nigra anjouanensis Meier, 1986	Anjouan Island day gecko
	Phelsuma v-nigra comoraegrandensis Meier, 1986	Grand Comoro day gecko
	Phelsuma v-nigra v-nigra Boettger, 1913	
