= Caracara major =

Caracara major Temporal range: Late Pleistocene

Scientific classification
- Domain: Eukaryota
- Kingdom: Animalia
- Phylum: Chordata
- Class: Aves
- Order: Falconiformes
- Family: Falconidae
- Genus: Caracara
- Species: †C. major

Binomial name
- †Caracara major Jones et al., 2013

Extinct falconid of the Late Pleistocene

Caracara major is a large and extinct species of bird in the family Falconidae of the Late Pleistocene period. Caracara major is noted for being extremely large in size and was found throughout what is now the nation of Uruguay. Following the discovery of the species Caracara major by Jones et al., 2013., a new fossil taxon in the same genus that was also located in Uruguay was described, said to be larger than Caracara major.

== See also ==
- List of extinct birds
