= Caracara seymouri =

Caracara seymouri Temporal range: Quaternary

Scientific classification
- Kingdom: Animalia
- Phylum: Chordata
- Class: Aves
- Order: Falconiformes
- Family: Falconidae
- Genus: Caracara
- Species: †C. seymouri

Binomial name
- †Caracara seymouri Suárez & Olson, 2014

Extinct species of bird

Caracara seymouri is an extinct species of Caracara that inhabited Ecuador and Peru during the Quaternary period.
