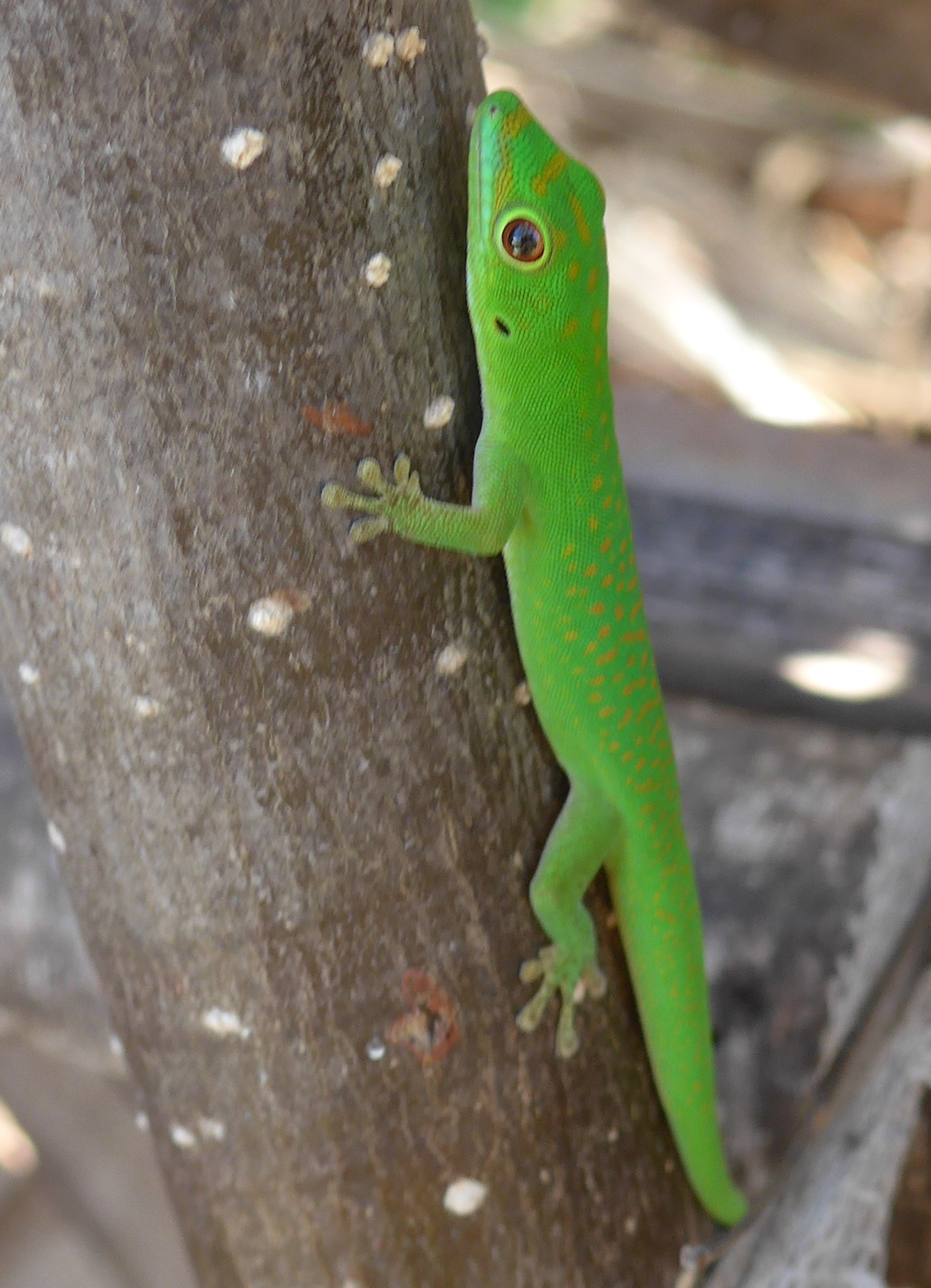

Scientific classification
- Domain: Eukaryota
- Kingdom: Animalia
- Phylum: Chordata
- Class: Reptilia
- Order: Squamata
- Infraorder: Gekkota
- Family: Gekkonidae
- Genus: Phelsuma
- Species: P. v-nigra
- Subspecies: P. v. anjouanensis

Trinomial name
- Phelsuma v-nigra anjouanensis Meier, 1986

= Anjouan Island day gecko =

Subspecies of lizard

The Anjouan Island day gecko (Phelsuma v-nigra anjouanensis) is a small diurnal subspecies of gecko. It lives in the Comoros and typically inhabits trees and bushes. The Anjouan Island day gecko feeds on insects and nectar.

== Description ==
This lizard belongs to the smallest day geckos. It can reach a maximum length of approximately 11 centimetres (4.3 in). The body colour is bright green. There is a red v-shaped stripe on the snout and a red barring between the eyes. On the back there are a number of tiny red-brick coloured spots and reticulations. On the throat, there is a faint v-shaped marking. The ventral side is greyish.

== Distribution ==
This subspecies only inhabits the island Anjouan in the Comoros.

== Habitat ==
Phelsuma v-nigra anjouanensis is found on agave bushes, banana trees, palms, human dwellings and even on the ground.

== Diet ==
These day geckos feed on various insects and other invertebrates. They also like to lick soft, sweet fruit, pollen and nectar.

== Care and maintenance in captivity ==
These animals should be housed in pairs and need a medium-sized, well planted terrarium. The daytime temperature should be between 28 and 30 °C (82 and 86 °F) and 24 and 26 °C (75 and 79 °F) at night. The humidity should be not too high. A two-month winter cooldown should be included during which temperature is 25 °C (77 °F) at daytime and 20 °C (68 °F) at night. In captivity, these animals can be fed with crickets, wax moth larvae, fruit flies, mealworms and houseflies.
