= John Frederick Miller =

English illustrator and ornithologist (1759–1796)

- Born: 1759
- Died: 1796 (aged 36–37)
- Known for: Icones animalium et plantarum or Various subjects of Natural History, wherein are delineated Birds, Animals and many curious Plants, &c.
- Scientific career
- Fields: Illustrator
- Author abbrev. (zoology): J.F.Miller

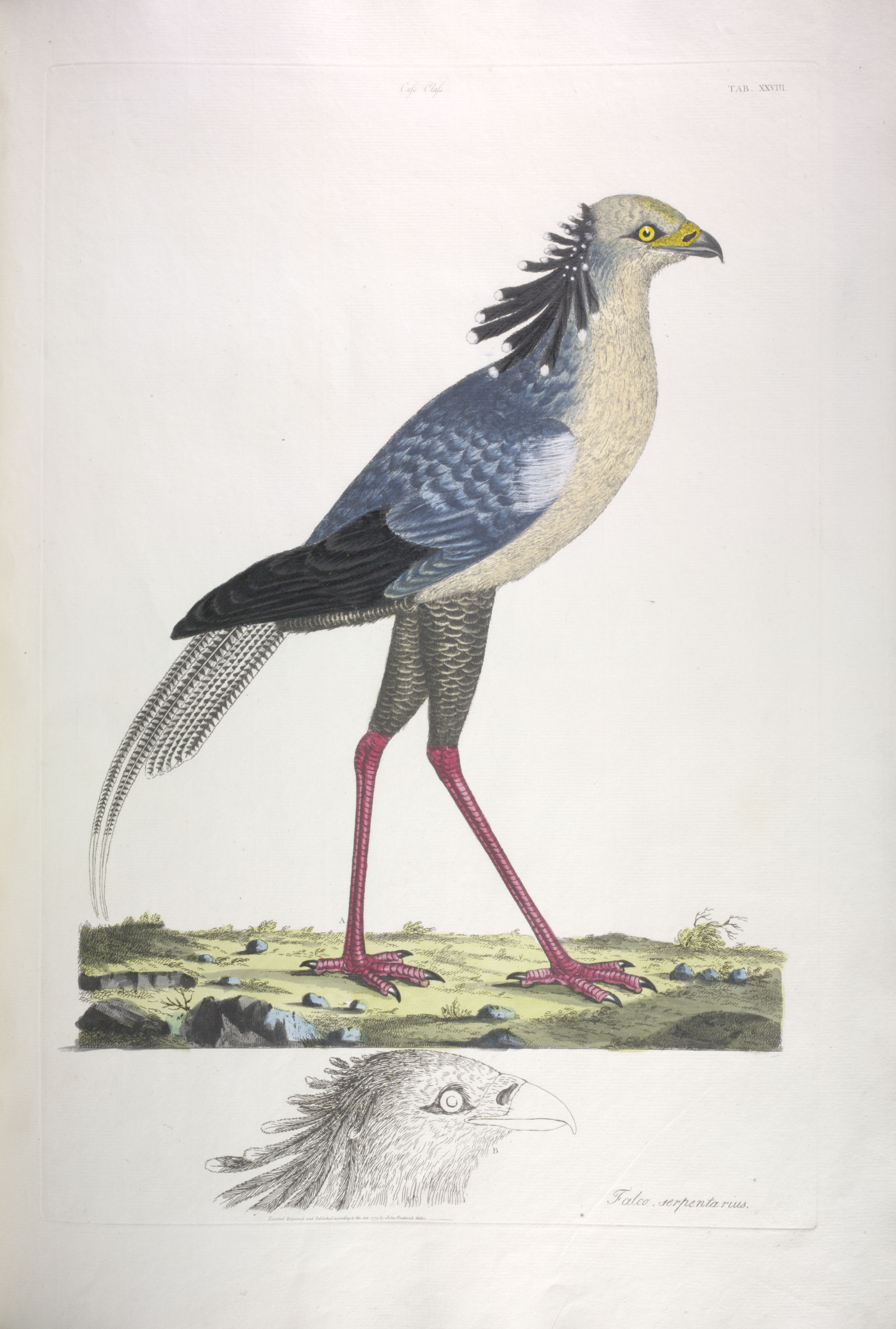
Secretarybird, Plate 28 in Icones animalium et plantarum, 1779

John Frederick Miller (active 1772–1796) was an English illustrator, mainly of botanical subjects.

Miller was the son of the artist Johann Sebastian Müller (1715 – c. 1790). Miller, along with his brother James, produced paintings from the sketches made by Sydney Parkinson on James Cook's first voyage. He accompanied Joseph Banks on his expedition to Iceland in 1772.

Between 1776 and 1785 Miller published 60 hand-coloured engravings in his Icones animalium et plantarum or Various subjects of Natural History, wherein are delineated Birds, Animals and many curious Plants, &c. Very few copies of this work survive. The plates include binomial names, some of which contain the oldest published specific epithet and therefore have priority over later scientific names. There are seven species of bird for which Miller's plate is the holotype; these include the king penguin, the secretarybird, the crested caracara and the extinct Tahiti crake.

The plates were re-issued in 1796 with text supplied by George Shaw under a new title: Cimelia Physica or Figures of rare and curious quadrupeds, birds, &c. together with several of the most elegant plants.

== Works ==
- Miller, John Frederick (1776–1785). Icones animalium et plantarum. Various subjects of Natural History, wherein are delineated Birds, Animals and many curious Plants, &c (in Latin). London. Published in 10 parts with 6 plates in each part. See: Sherborn, C.D.; Iredale, T. (1921). "J. F. Miller's Icones". Ibis. 11th series. 3 (2): 302–309. doi:10.1111/j.1474-919X.1921.tb00801.x. A scan of the copy held the Natural History Museum in London is available from the Biodiversity Heritage Library. It is missing Part 10 with its 6 plates. The scan available from the Bibliothèque nationale de France is missing Parts 9 and 10.
- Miller, John Frederick Miller; Shaw, George (1796). Cimelia Physica. Figures of rare and curious guadrupeds, birds, etc., together with several of the most elegant plants engraved & coloured, from the subjects themselves. London: Printed by T. Bensley for Benjamin and John White, Horace's Head, Fleet-Street, and John Sewell, Cornhill. OCLC 642452311.
