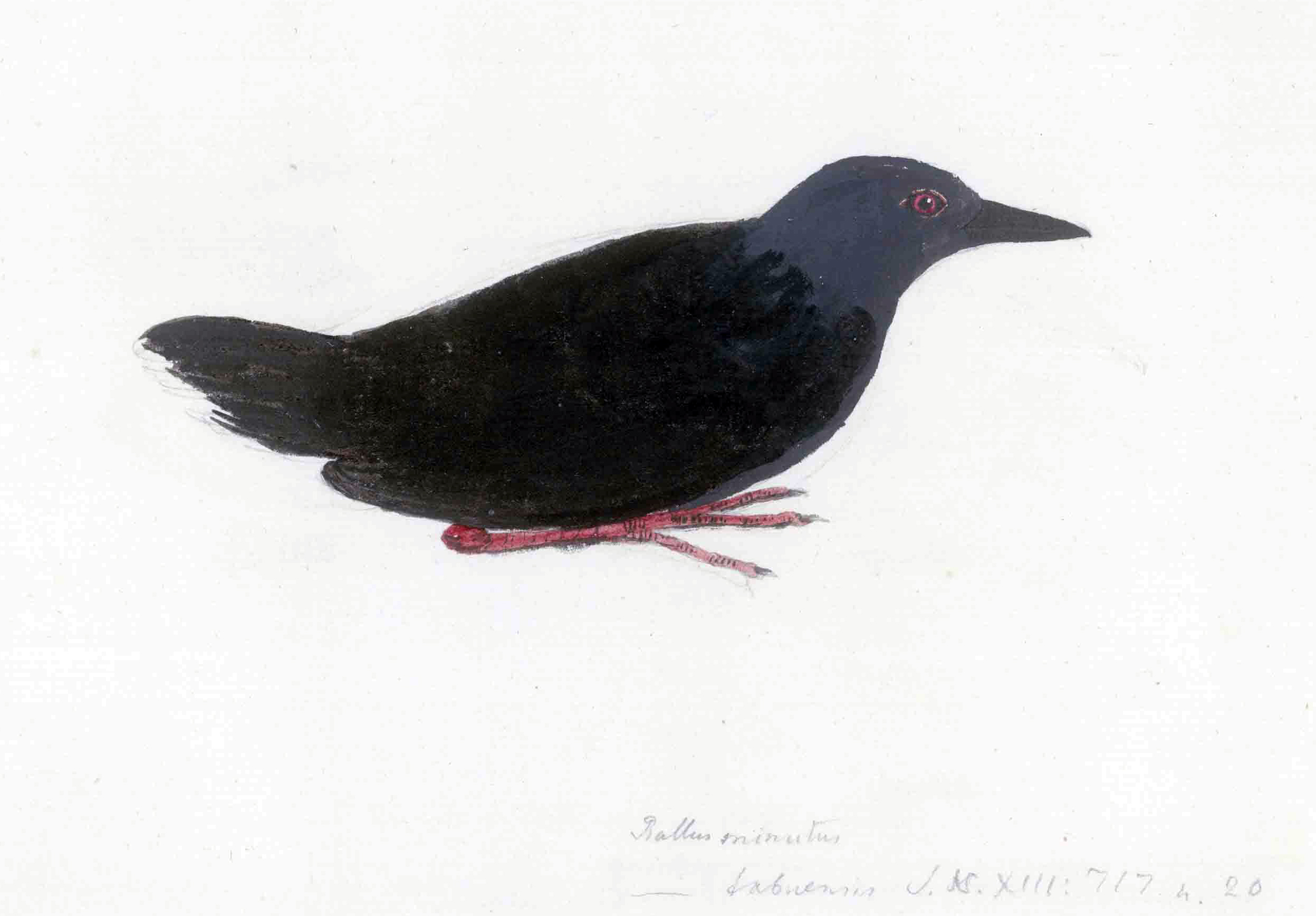
- Drawing by Georg Forster

Conservation status
- Extinct (IUCN 3.1)

Scientific classification
- Kingdom: Animalia
- Phylum: Chordata
- Class: Aves
- Order: Gruiformes
- Family: Rallidae
- Genus: Zapornia
- Species: †Z. nigra

Binomial name
- †Zapornia nigra (J. F. Miller, 1784)

Synonyms
- Rallus nigra Nesophylax niger Porzana nigra

= Tahiti crake =

Extinct species of bird

The Tahiti crake (Zapornia nigra), also known as Miller's rail, is an extinct species of bird in the family Rallidae. It was endemic to Tahiti. It was discovered and painted by Georg Forster during the second Cook voyage. John Frederick Miller copied Forster's painting and published it with some changes in his work Icones animalium et plantarum in 1784. Miller coined the binomial name Rallus nigra. It probably went extinct in about 1800 from introduced predators.

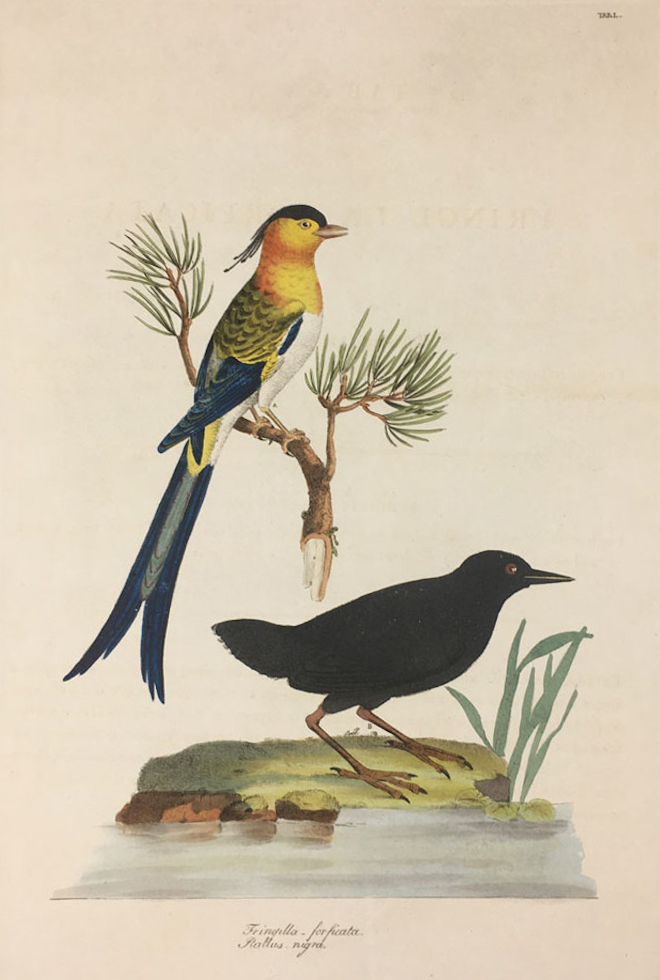
Illustration by John Frederick Miller
