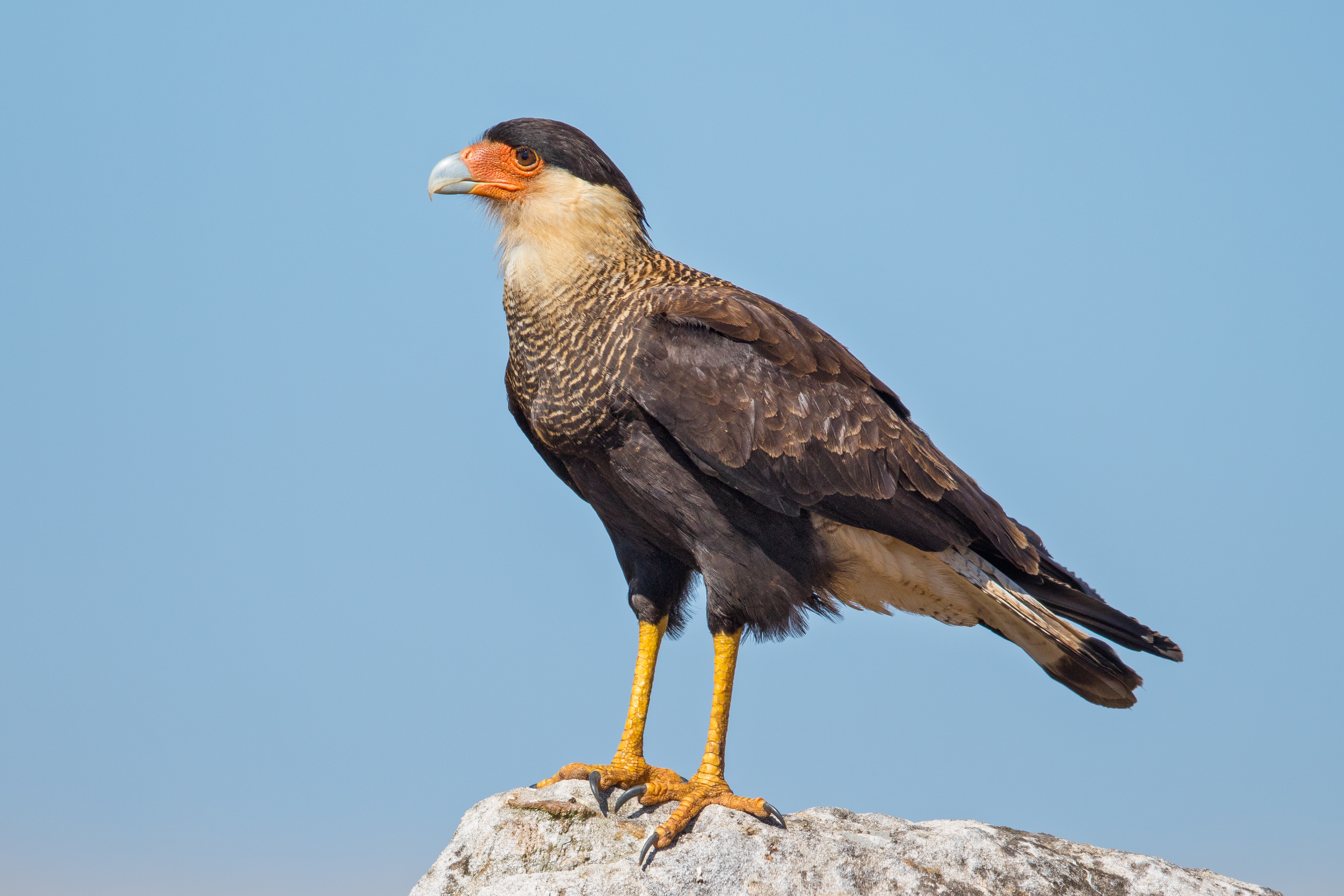
- An adult crested caracara in Serra da Canastra National Park, Brazil

Conservation status
- Least Concern (IUCN 3.1)

- Secure (NatureServe)

Scientific classification
- Kingdom: Animalia
- Phylum: Chordata
- Class: Aves
- Order: Falconiformes
- Family: Falconidae
- Genus: Caracara
- Species: C. plancus

Binomial name
- Caracara plancus (Miller, JF, 1777)
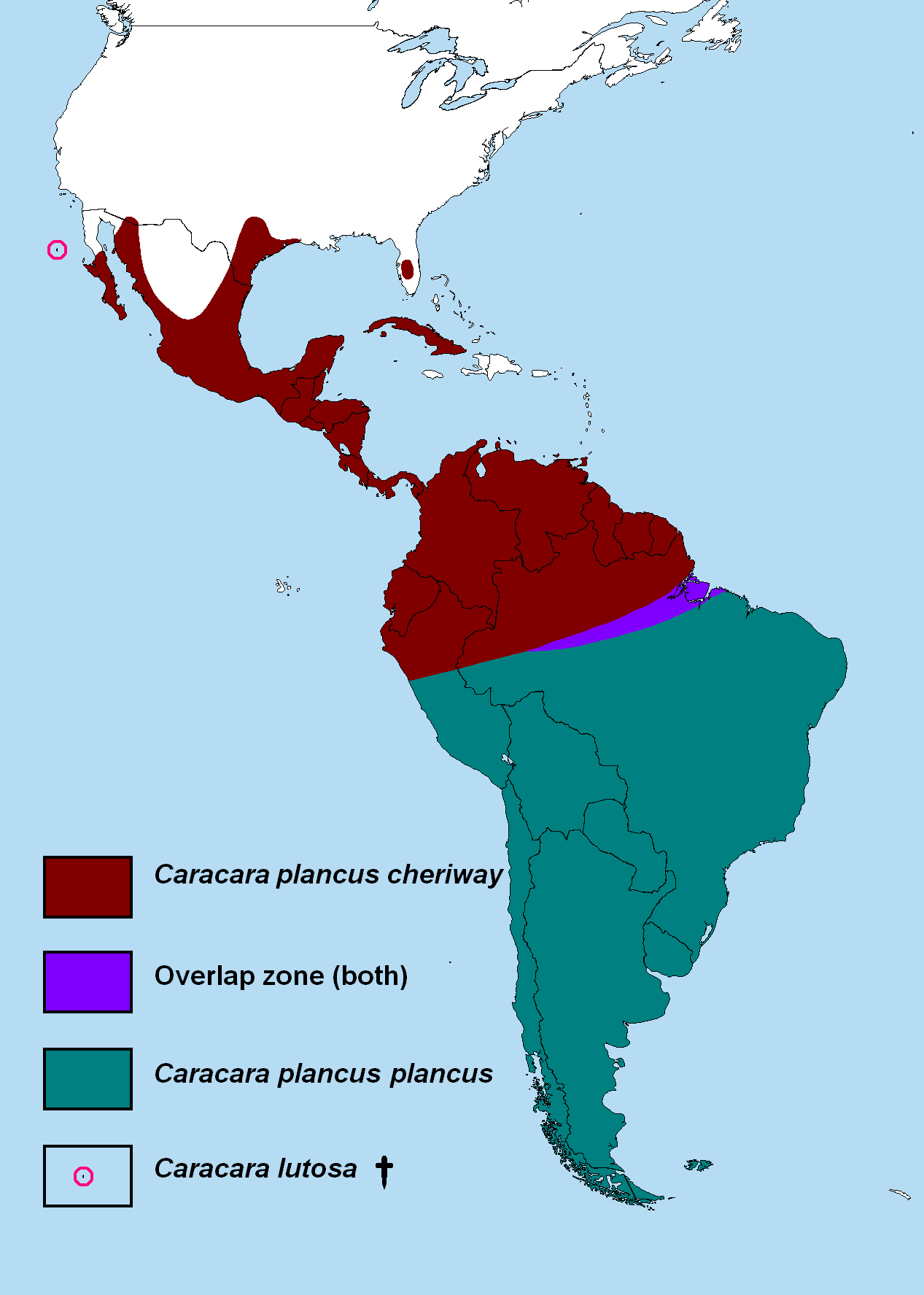

Synonyms
- Polyborus plancus

= Crested caracara =

Species of bird

The crested caracara (Caracara plancus) is a bird of prey (raptor) in the falcon family, Falconidae. It was formerly placed in the genus Polyborus before being given in its own genus, Caracara. It is native to and found in the southern and southeastern United States, Mexico (where it is present in every state) and the majority of mainland Latin America, as well as some Caribbean islands. The crested caracara is quite adaptable and hardy, for a species found predominantly in the neotropics; it can be found in a range of environments and ecosystems, including semi-arid and desert climates, maritime or coastal areas, subtropical and tropical forests, temperate regions, plains, swamps, and even in urban areas. Documented, albeit rare, sightings have occurred as far north as Minnesota and the Canadian provinces of Alberta, Ontario, and Prince Edward Island. The southern extent of the crested caracara's distribution can reach as far as Tierra del Fuego and Magallanes Region, Chile.

== Etymology ==
The word "caracara" ultimately traces its origins to Old Tupi karakará. Further etymology is uncertain, but it is assumed to be onomatopoeic, imitating the bird's call.

The crested caracara is also known as the Mexican eagle, although it is not a true eagle. This stems from a 1960 proposal by Rafael Martín del Campo, supposedly based on an analysis of pre-Conquest imagery, that the "bird atop a prickly pear" associated with the mythical founding of Tenochtitlan was a caracara, and not a golden eagle (which is a rare sight in Mexico, especially as far south as Tenochtitlan) as is traditionally depicted. Nonetheless, since at least the Spanish Conquest, the golden eagle has been the bird irrevocably associated with the founding myth, featuring prominently in independent Mexico's national insignia as well as being its national animal.

=== "Texan eagle" ===
Balduin Möllhausen, the German artist accompanying the 1853 railroad survey (led by Lt. Amiel Weeks Whipple) from the Canadian River to California along the 35th parallel, recounted observing what he called the "Texan Eagle", which, in his account, he identified as Audubon's Polyborus vulgaris. This sighting occurred in the Sans Bois Mountains in southeastern Oklahoma.

== Taxonomy ==
In 1777, English illustrator John Frederick Miller included a hand-coloured plate of the crested caracara in his Icones animalium et plantarum ("icons of the animal and plant world"). He coined the binomial name Falco plancus and specified the type locality as Tierra del Fuego. The specific epithet plancus is Latin for "eagle". The crested caracara is now placed in the genus Caracara (which was introduced in 1826 by German naturalist Blasius Merrem).

Two subspecies are recognised:

- C. p. cheriway (Jacquin, 1784) – United States (Southern California, Arizona, Florida, Louisiana, New Mexico, Texas), México (present in every state), Belize, El Salvador, Guatemala, Honduras, Nicaragua, Costa Rica, Panamá, Colombia, Venezuela, Ecuador, Guyana, Suriname, French Guiana, and north Roraima, Brazil; Caribbean islands of Cuba, Aruba, Guanaja and Roatán (Honduras), and Trinidad; the Pacific Islas Marías (Mexico) and Isla del Rey (Panamá). Individual birds have been seen as far north as Dallas, Texas and Santa Cruz, California.
- C. p. plancus (Miller, JF, 1777) – SE Perú, N Bolivia to Eastern Brazil, south to Tierra del Fuego and the Falkland Islands.

The subspecies C. p. cheriway was formerly classed as a separate species, with the common English name of the northern crested caracara.

== Distribution and habitat ==
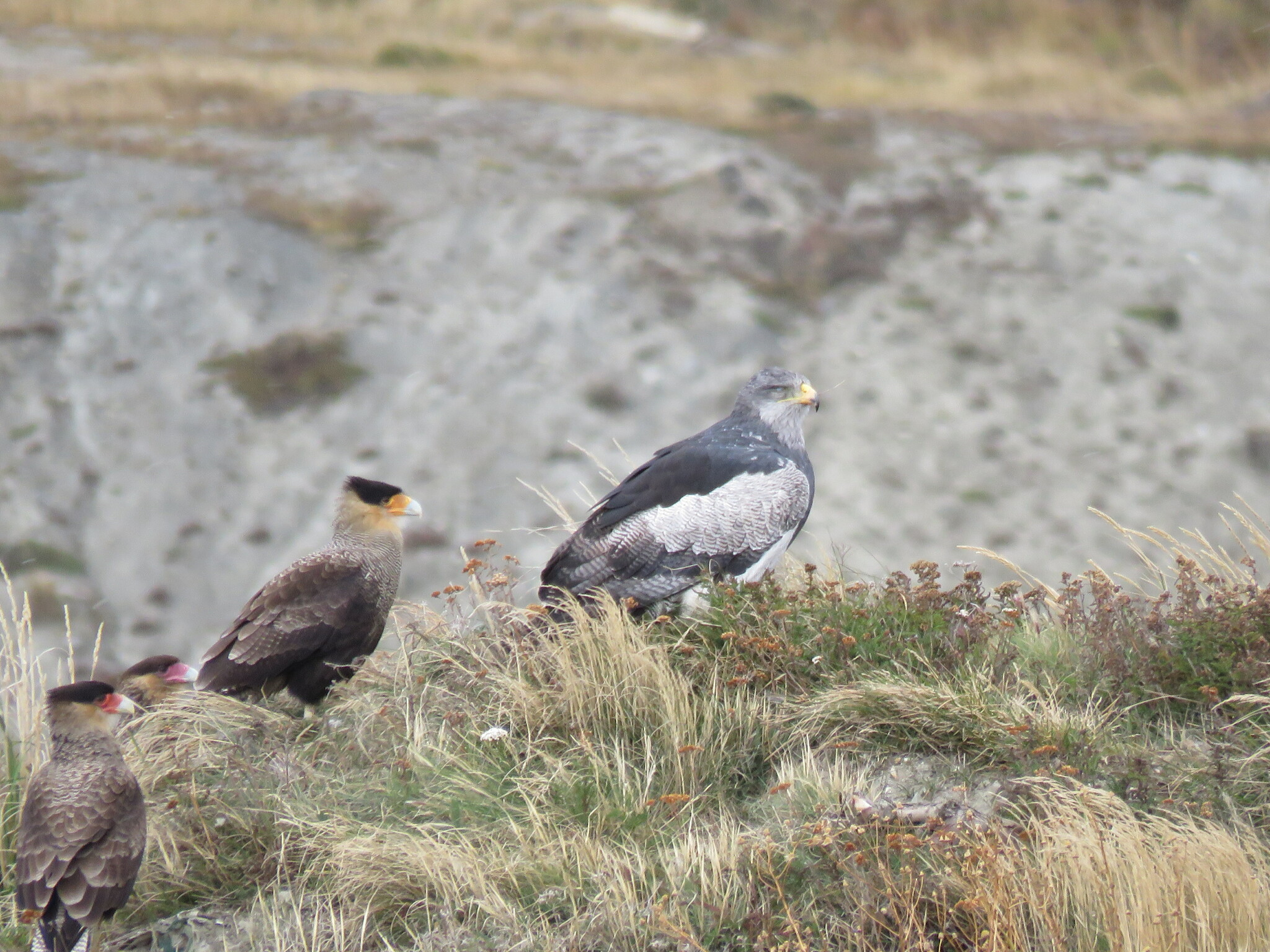
Crested caracaras with a black-chested buzzard-eagle, in Argentina
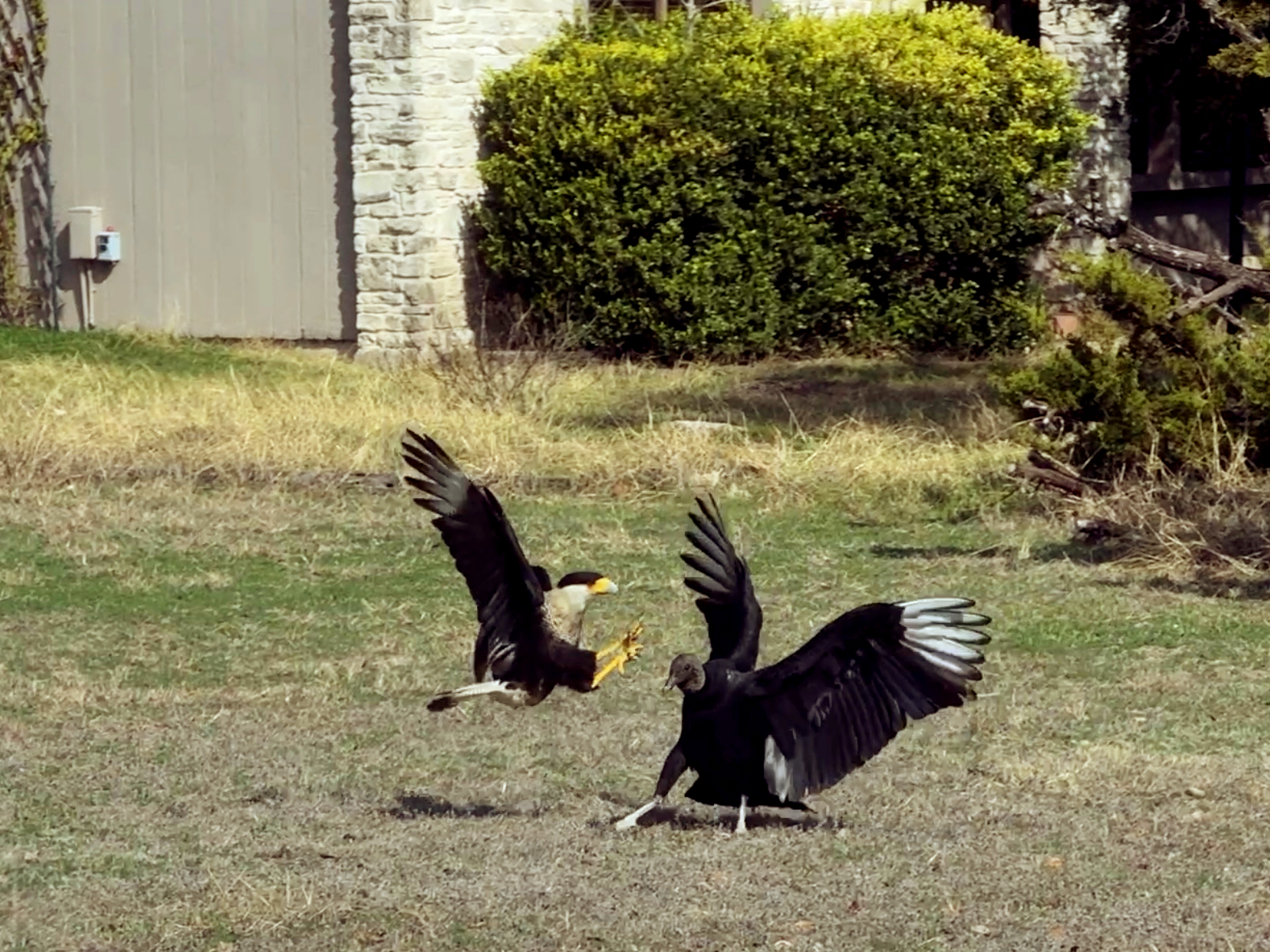
In conflict with a black vulture, in Texas

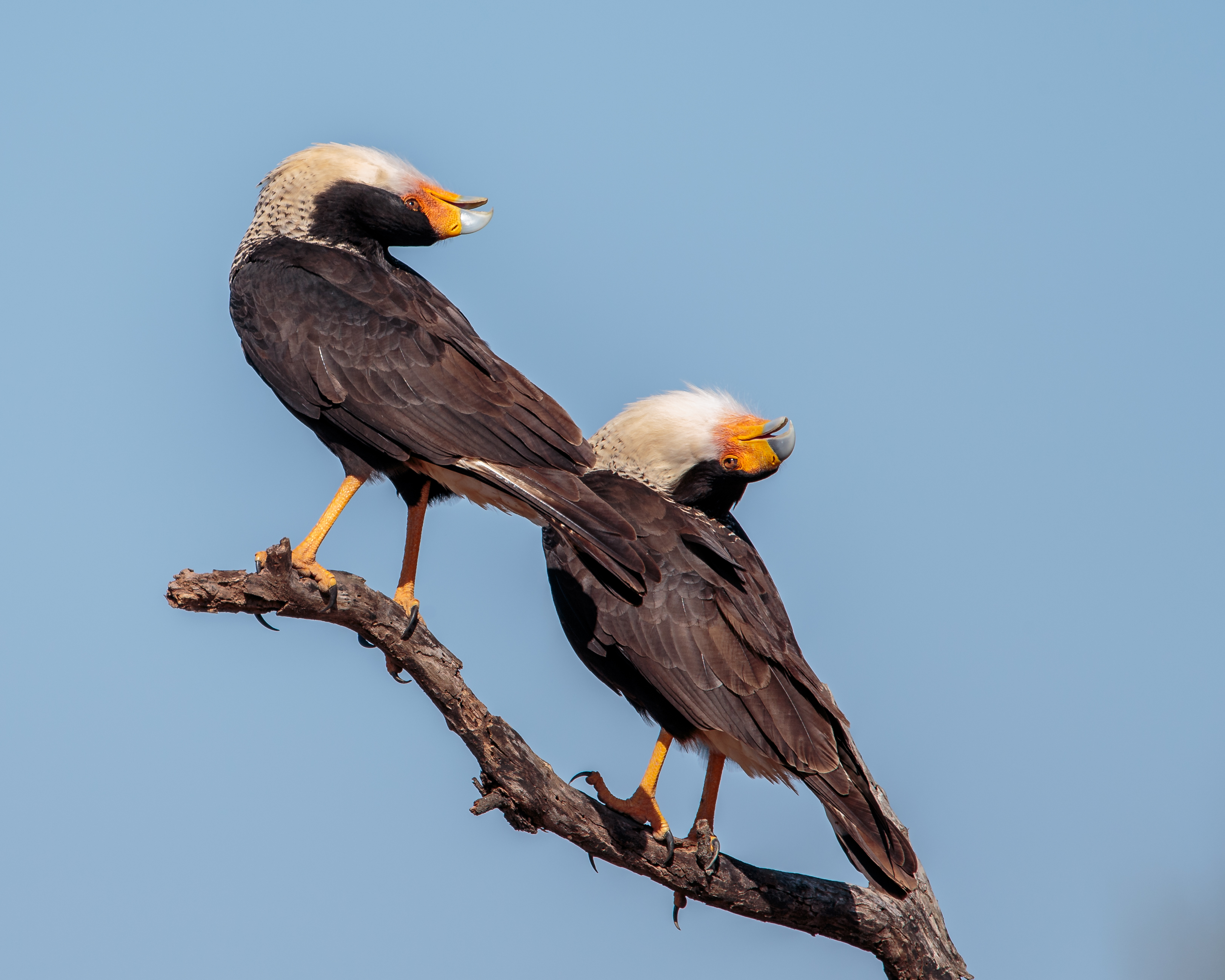
Courtship display, in Texas. The male, which is slightly smaller, is on the left.

The crested caracara occurs from Tierra del Fuego in southernmost South America to the southern United States, Mexico, and Central America. An isolated population occurs on the Falkland Islands. It avoids the Andean highlands and dense humid forests, such as the Amazon rainforest, where it is largely restricted to relatively open sections along major rivers. Otherwise, it occurs in virtually any open or semi-open habitat and is often found near humans.

Reports have been made of the crested caracara as far north as San Francisco, California. and, in 2012, near Crescent City, California. Some are believed to possibly be living in Nova Scotia, with numerous sightings throughout the 2010s.

The species has recently become more common in central and north Texas and is generally common in south Texas and south of the US border. It can also be found (nesting) in the Southern Caribbean (e.g. Aruba, Curaçao and Bonaire), Mexico, and Central America.

=== In Florida ===
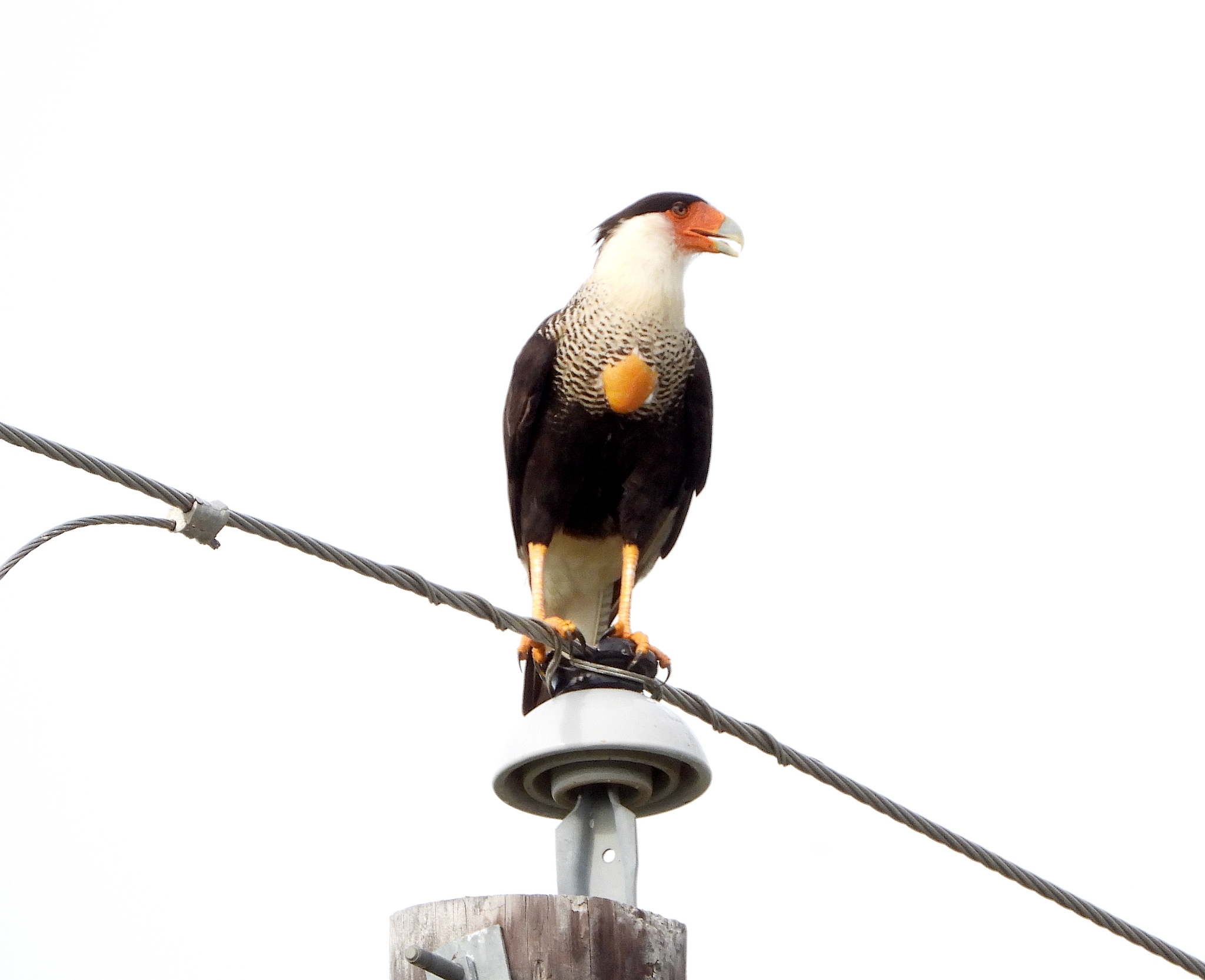
Showing a full crop, in Texas

Florida is home to a relict population of northern crested caracaras that dates to the last glacial period, which ended around 12,500 BP. At that time, Florida and the rest of the Gulf Coast were covered in an oak savanna. As temperatures increased, the savanna between Florida and Texas disappeared. Caracaras were able to survive in the prairies of central Florida and the marshes along the St. Johns River. Cabbage palmettos are a preferred nesting site, although they also nest in southern live oaks. Their historical range on the modern-day Florida peninsula included Okeechobee, Osceola, Highlands, Glades, Polk, Indian River, St. Lucie, Hardee, DeSoto, Brevard, Collier, and Martin counties. They are currently most common in DeSoto, Glades, Hendry, Highlands, Okeechobee, and Osceola Counties. It has been seen on the East Coast as far as extreme eastern Brevard County, Florida (Viera, Florida), where it is now considered a resident, but listed as threatened. In February 2023 a crested caracara was identified in St, Johns County, Florida and documented by The St. Johns County Audubon Society on their social media page.

=== Vagrancy ===
In July 2016 a northern caracara was reported and photographed by numerous people in the upper peninsula of Michigan, just outside of Munising. In June 2017, a northern caracara was sighted far north in St. George, New Brunswick, Canada. A specimen was photographed in Woodstock, Vermont in March 2020.

== Description ==
The crested caracara has a total length of 50–65 cm (20–26 in) and a wingspan of 120–132 cm (47–52 in). Its weight is 0.9–1.6 kg (2.0–3.5 lb), averaging 1,348 g (2.972 lb) in seven birds from Tierra del Fuego. Individuals from the colder southern part of its range average larger than those from tropical regions (as predicted by Bergmann's rule) and are the largest type of caracara. In fact, they are the second-largest species of falcon in the world by mean body mass, second only to the gyrfalcon.

The cap, belly, thighs, most of the wings, and tail tip are dark brownish, the auriculars (feathers surrounding the ear), throat, and nape are whitish-buff, and the chest, neck, mantle, back, upper tail coverts, crissum (the undertail coverts surrounding the cloaca), and basal part of the tail are whitish-buff barred dark brownish. In flight, the outer primaries show a large conspicuous whitish-buff patch ('window'), as in several other species of caracaras. The legs are yellow and the bare facial skin and cere are deep yellow to reddish-orange. (The facial color can change depending on the bird's mood.) Juveniles resemble adults, but are paler, with streaking on the chest, neck, and back, grey legs, and whitish, later pinkish-purple, facial skin and cere.

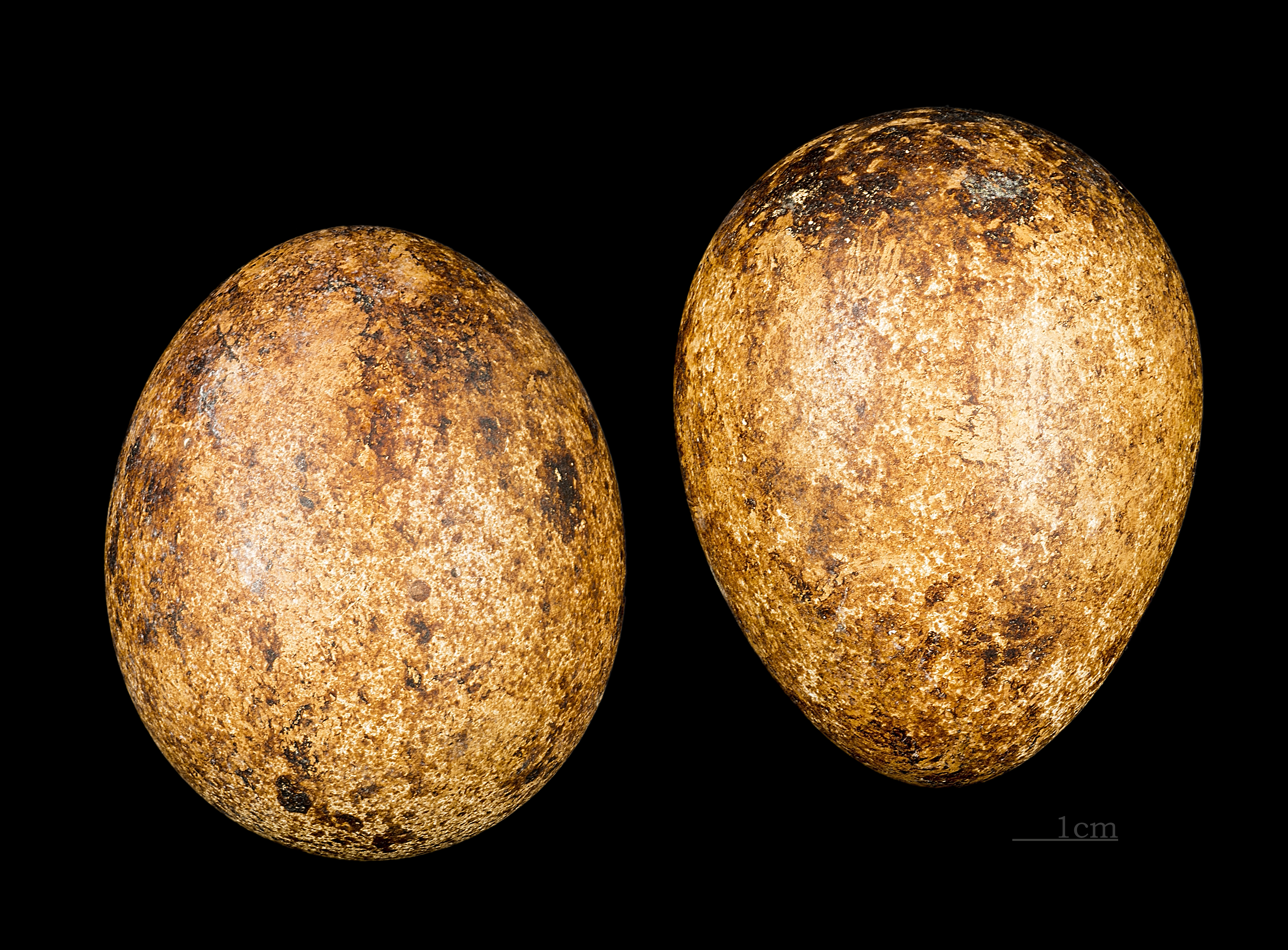
Eggs, MHNT

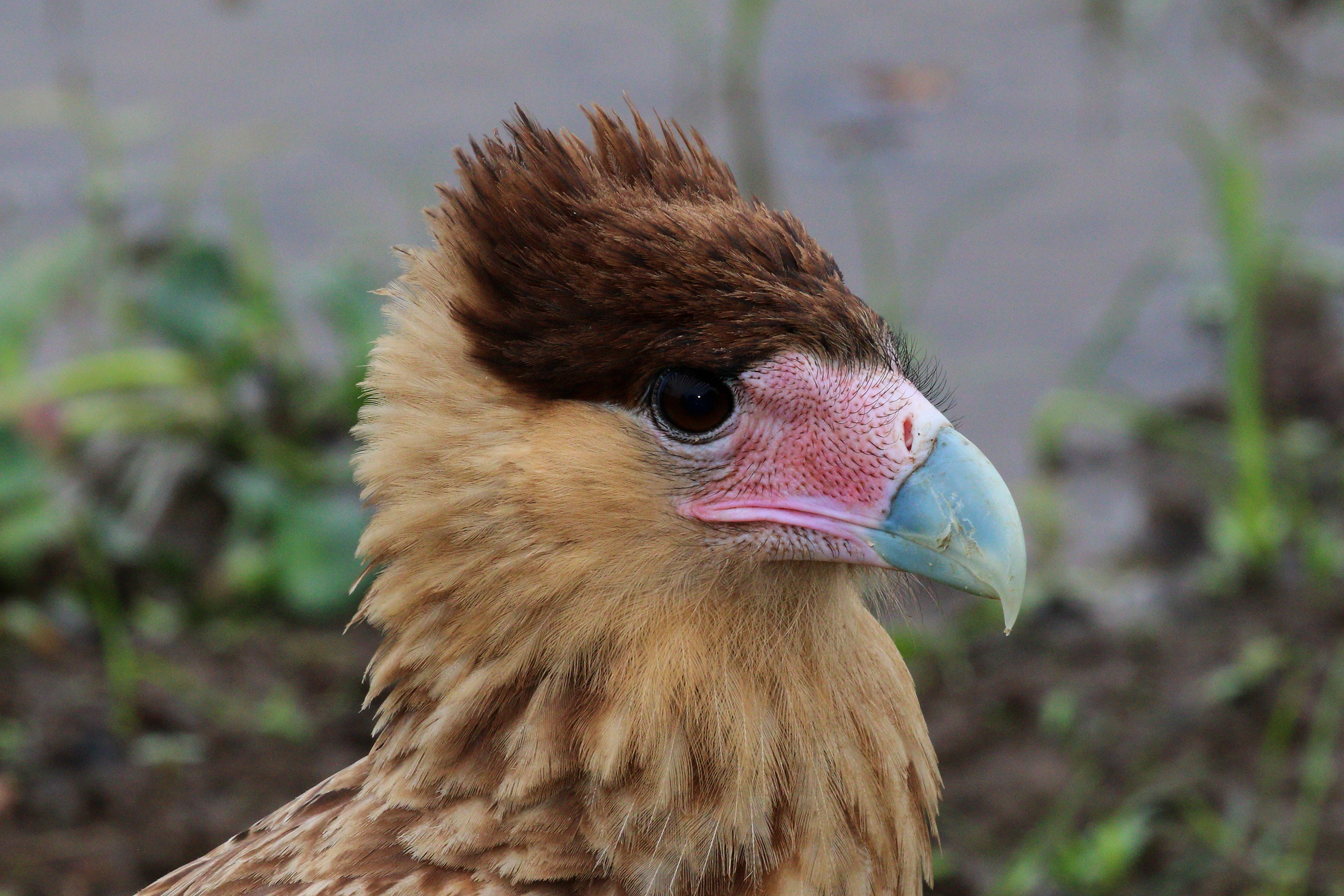
Juvenile

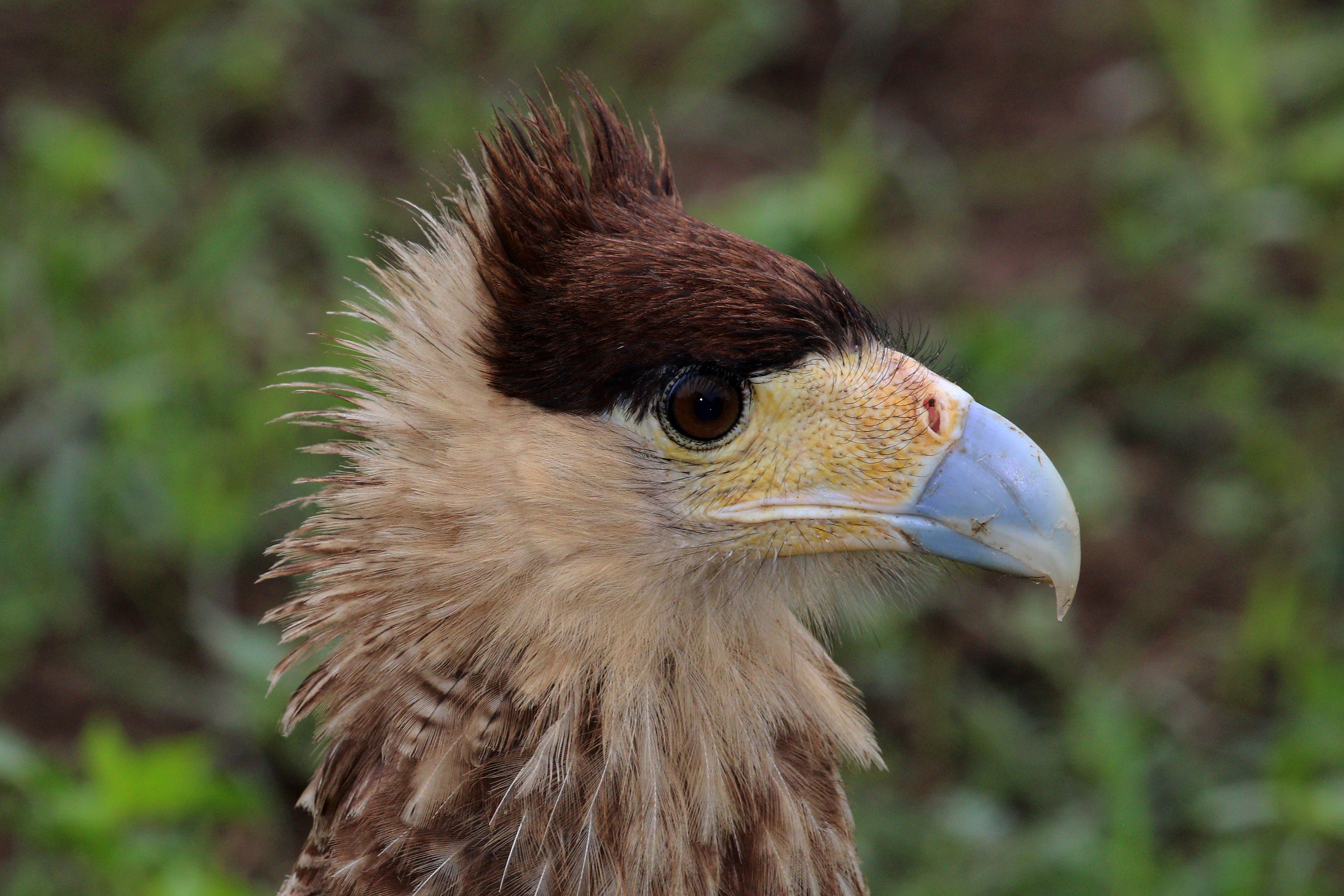
Young adult

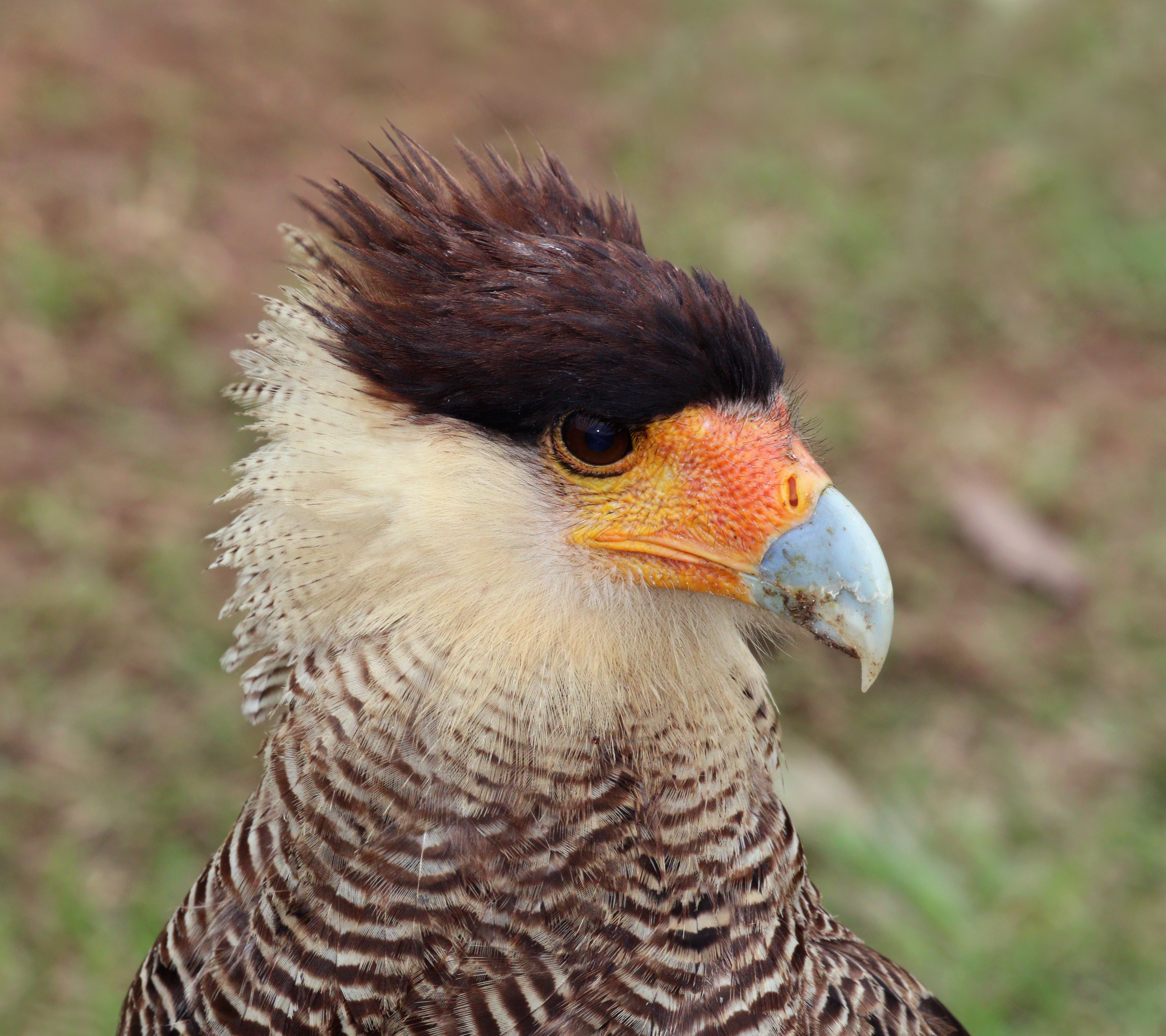
Adult

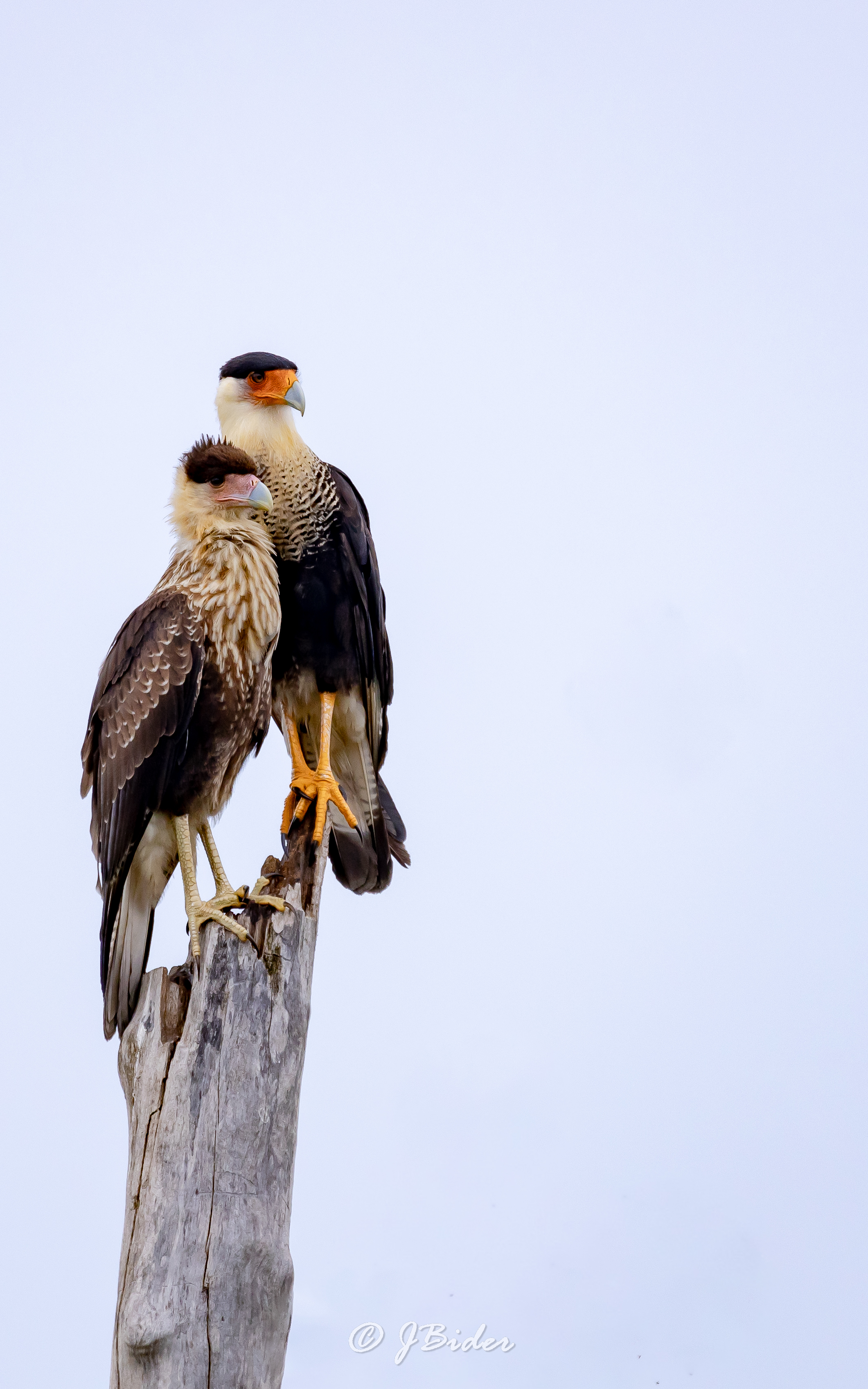
An adult and juvenile

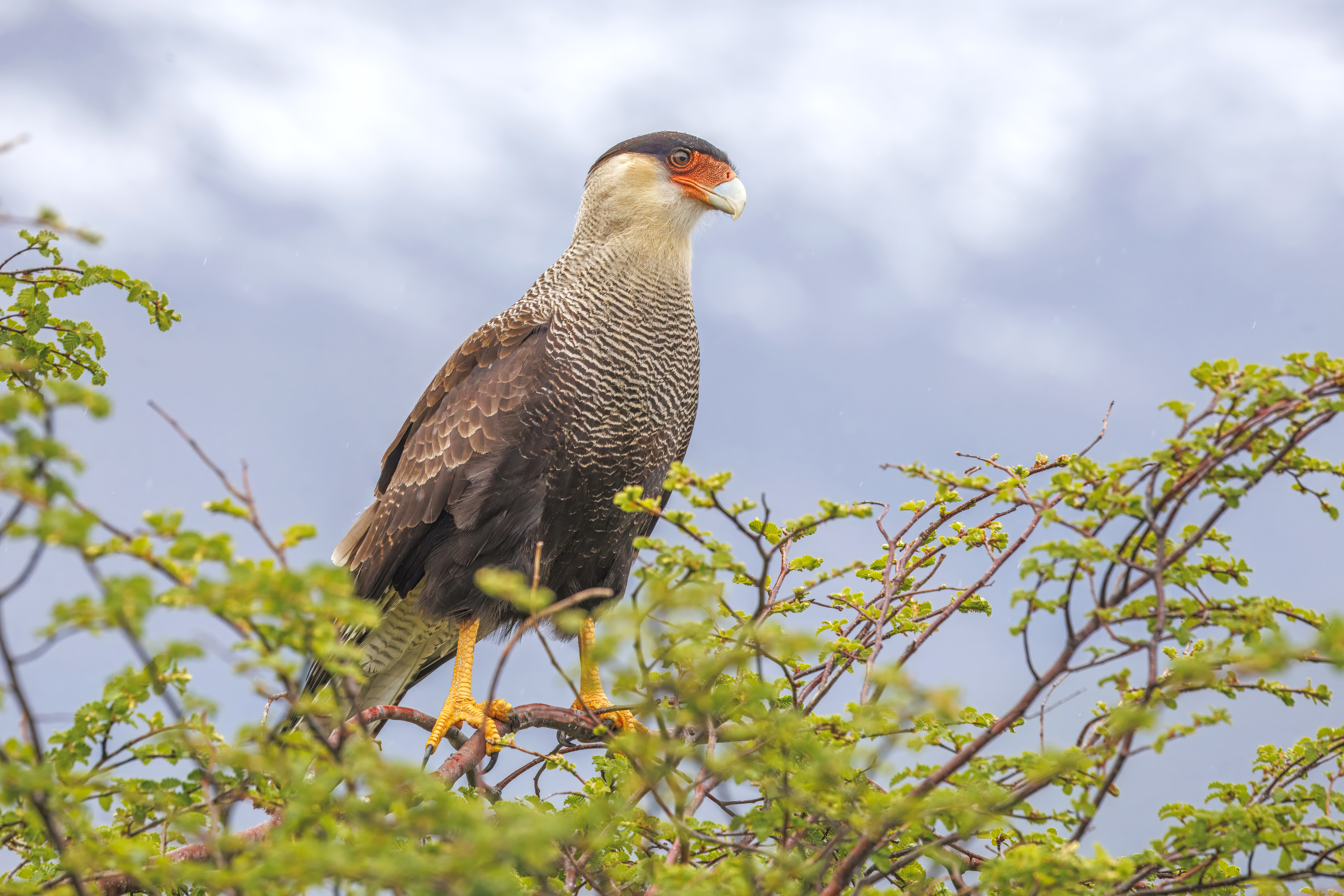
adult

== Behavior ==
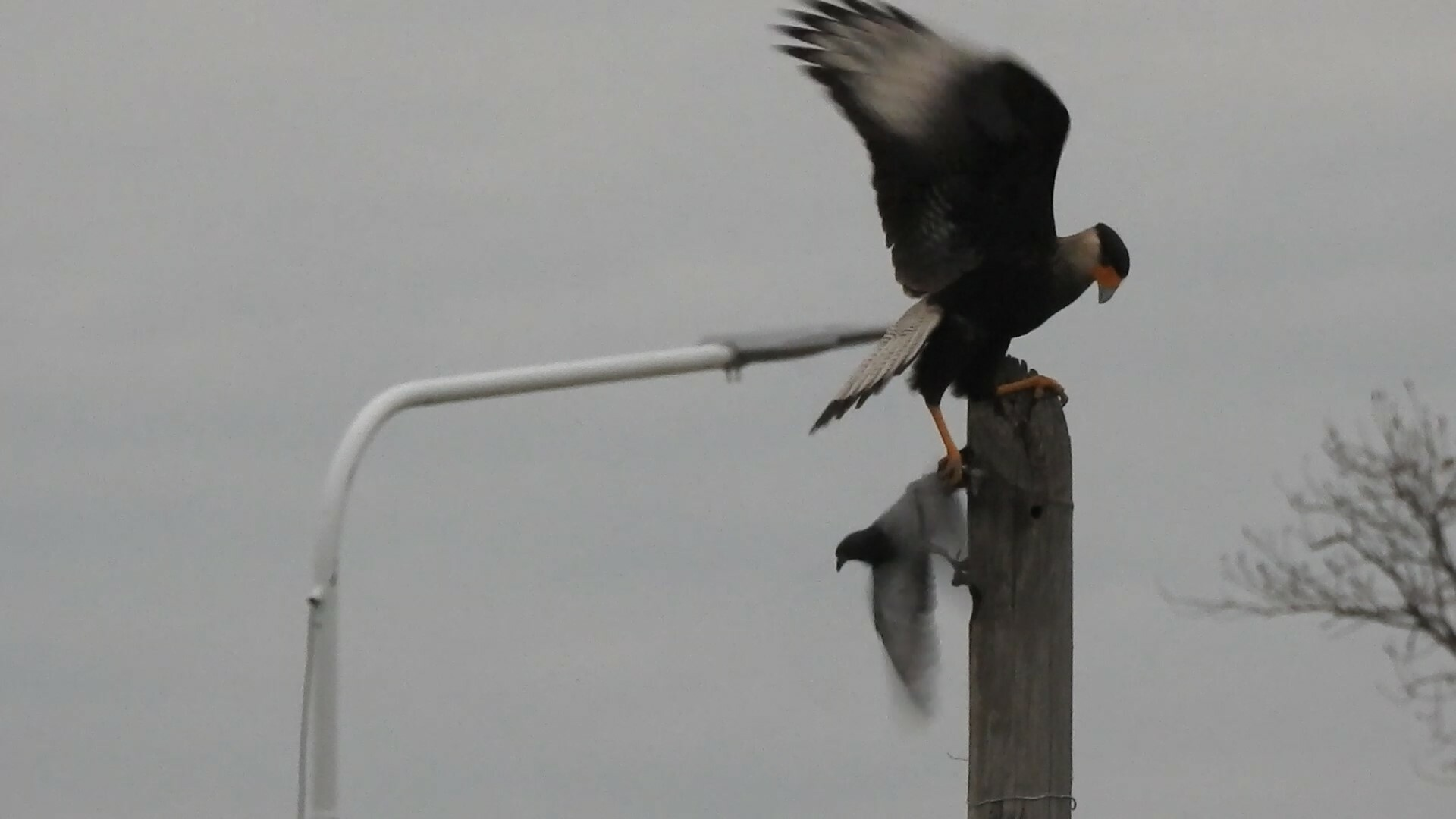
Catching a feral pigeon, in Argentina

A bold, opportunistic raptor, the crested caracara is often seen walking around on the ground looking for food. It mainly feeds on carcasses of dead animals, but it also steals food from other raptors, raids bird and reptile nests, and takes live prey if the possibility arises; mostly this is insects or other small prey, such as small mammals, small birds, amphibians, reptiles, fish, crabs, other shellfish, maggots, and worms, but it can include creatures up to the size of a snowy egret. It may also eat fruit. It is dominant over the black and turkey vulture at carcasses.

Furthermore, it also pirates food from them and buteos, as well as from brown pelicans, ibises, and spoonbills, chasing and harrying until they regurgitate or drop food. The crested caracara takes live prey that has been flushed by wildfire, cattle, and farming equipment. Locally, it has even learnt to follow trains or cars for food thrown out. The opportunistic nature of this species means that the crested caracara seeks out the phenomena associated with its food, e.g. wildfires and circling vultures. It is typically solitary, but several individuals may gather at a large food source (e.g. dumps). Breeding takes place in the Southern Hemisphere spring/summer in the southern part of its range, but timing is less strict in warmer regions. The nest is a large, open structure, typically placed on the top of a tree or palm, but sometimes on the ground. The typical clutch size is two eggs.

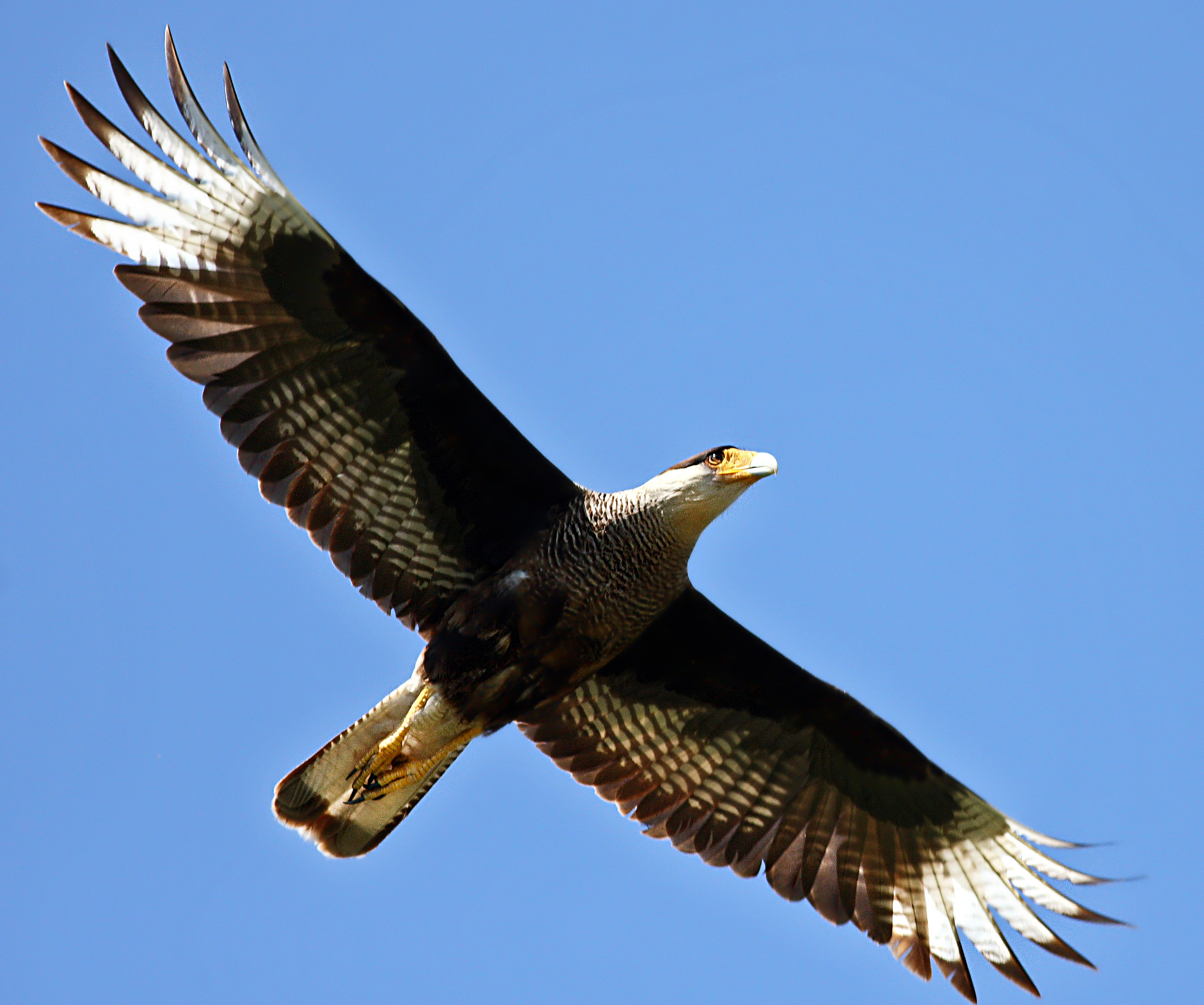
Young adult, showing the distinctive light 'windows' in the wings

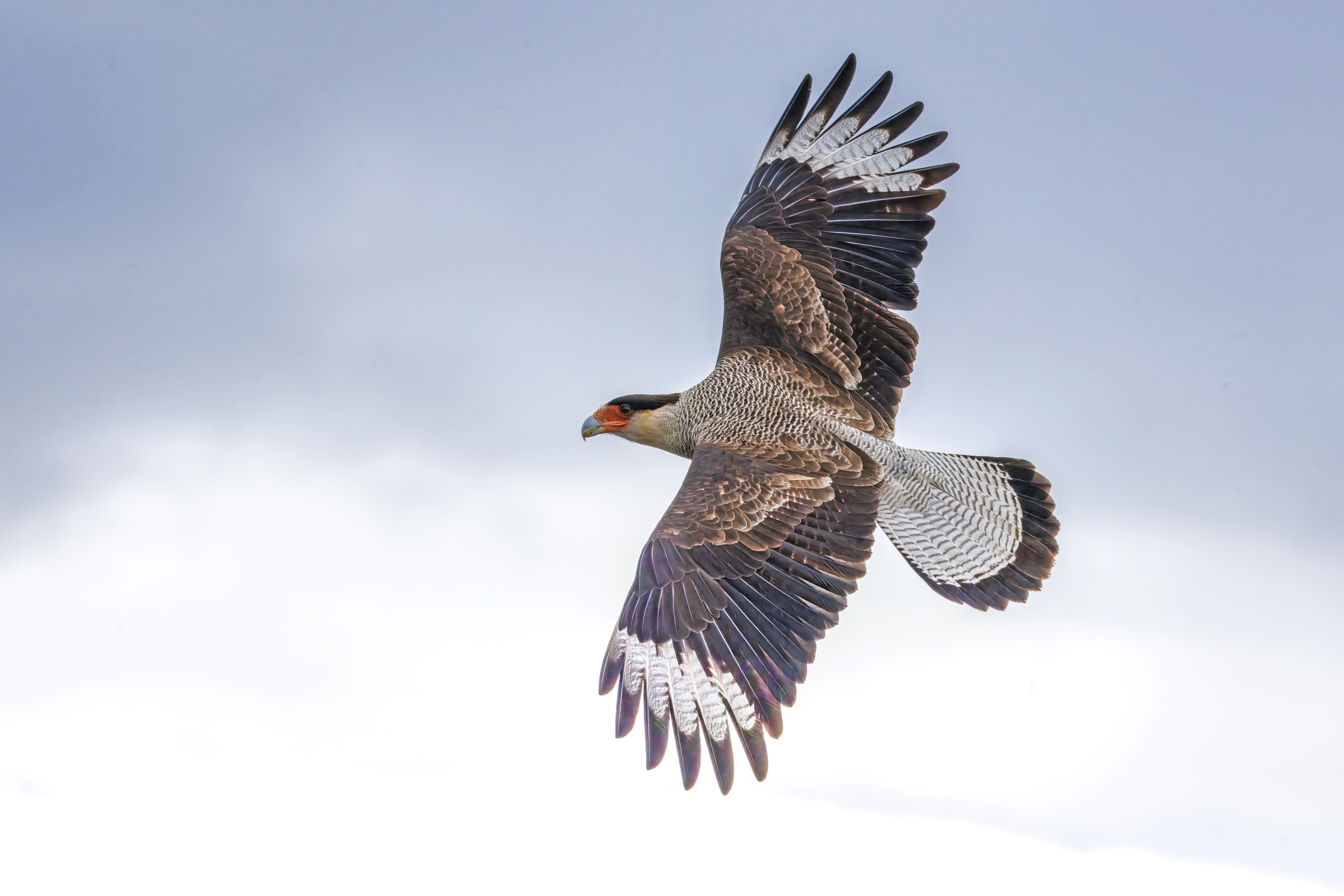
adult, showing wing upperside

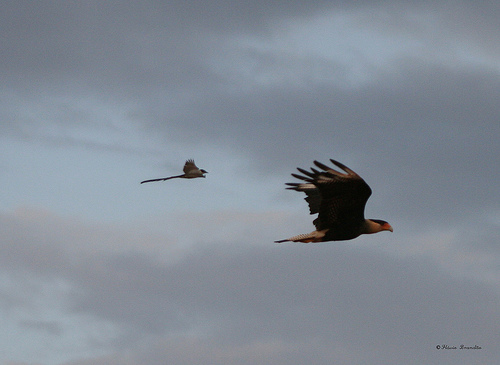
Being mobbed by a fork-tailed flycatcher

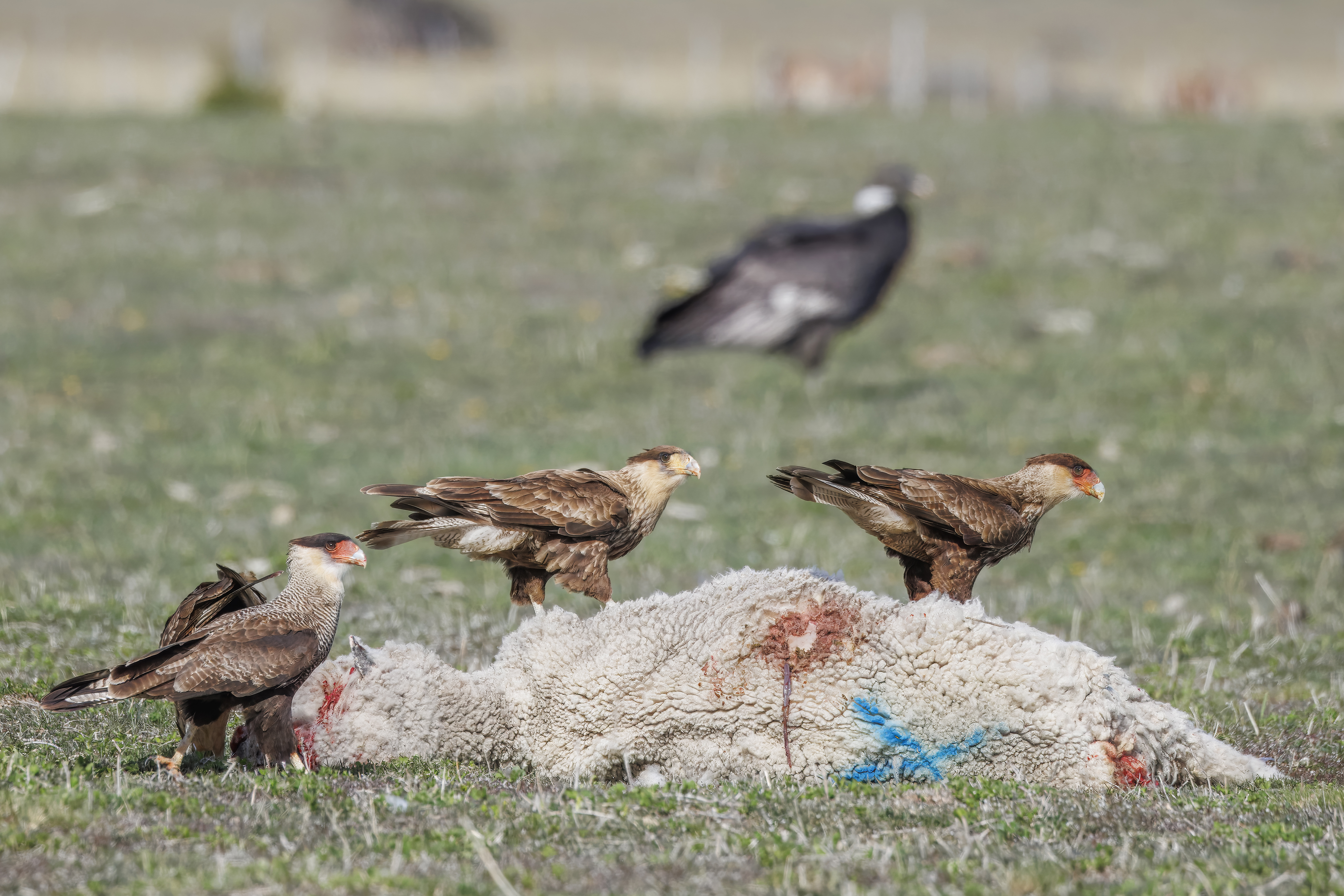
At a sheep carcass

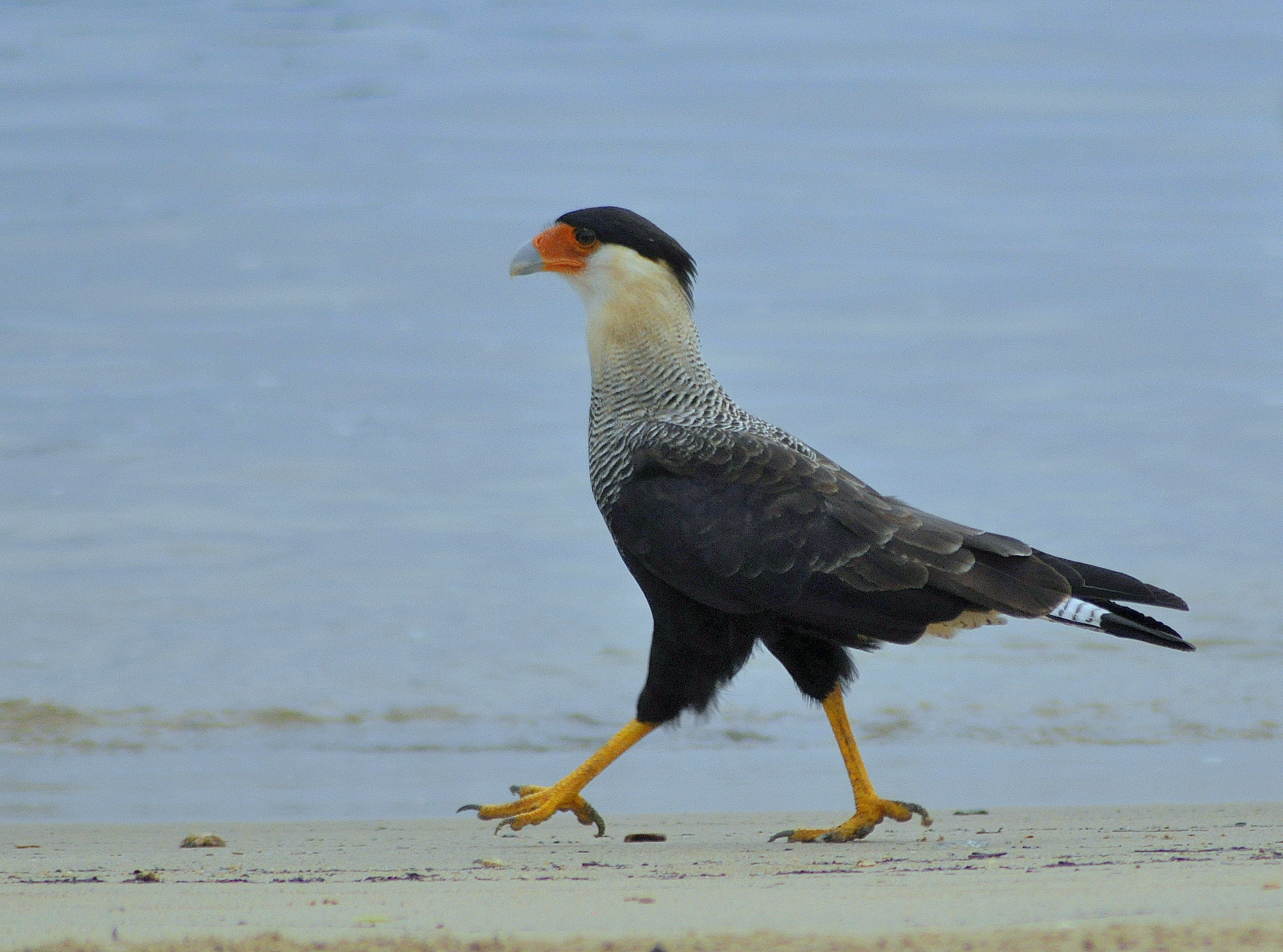
Walking along a beach, in Ilhabela, Brazil

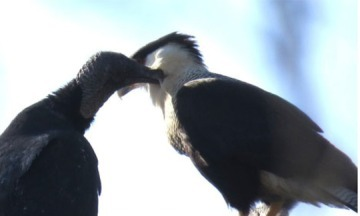
Black vulture preening a crested caracara, in Texas

There are several recorded instances of black vultures approaching and preening crested caracaras. In all cases, the unusual behaviour begins with the caracara bowing its head down, in an apparent invitation to preen.

== Status ==
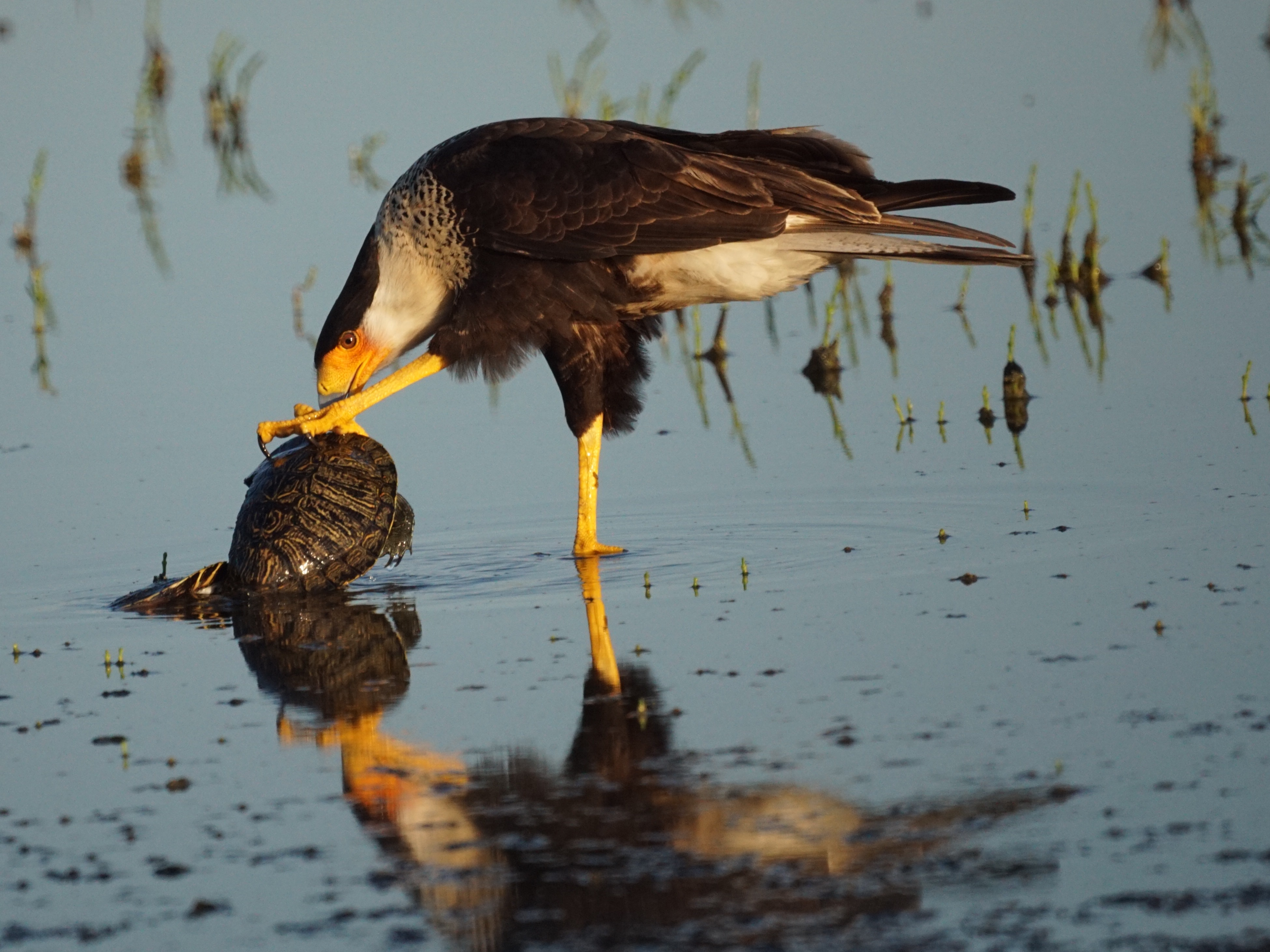
Feeding on a terrapin, in Texas

Throughout most of its range, its occurrence is common to very common. It is likely to benefit from the widespread deforestation in tropical South America, so is considered to be of least concern by BirdLife International.

== Predation ==
In Florida, crested caracaras may be eaten by some growth stage of invasive snakes such as Burmese pythons, reticulated pythons, Southern African rock pythons, Central African rock pythons, boa constrictors, yellow anacondas, Bolivian anacondas, dark-spotted anacondas, and green anacondas.

== In culture ==
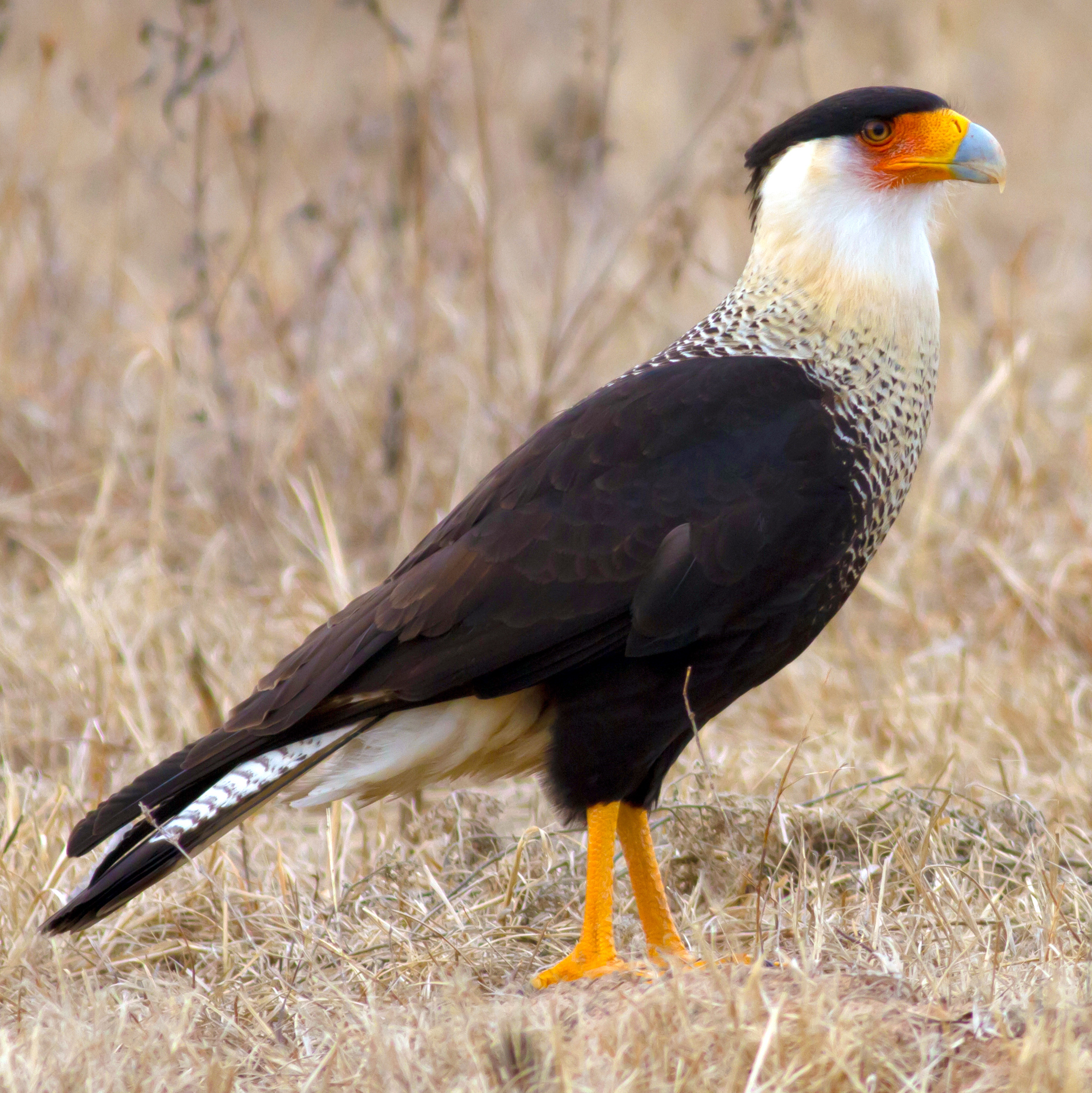
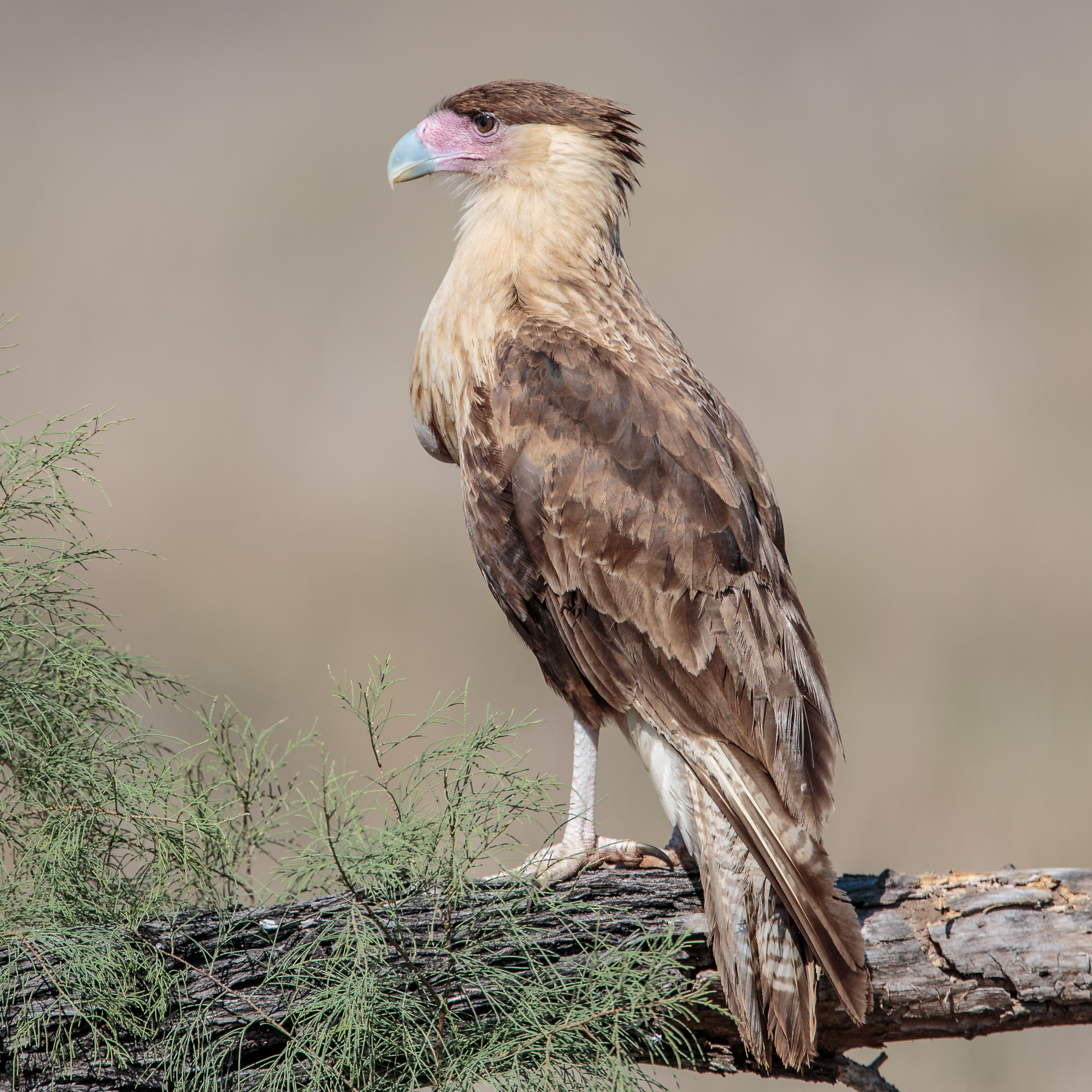
Adult (left) and juvenile (right), in Texas

Mexican ornithologist Rafael Martín del Campo proposed that the northern caracara was possibly the sacred "eagle" depicted in several pre-Columbian Aztec codices, as well as the Florentine Codex. This imagery was adopted as a national symbol of Mexico, but it is not the bird depicted on the flag, which is a golden eagle (Aquila chrysaetos), the national bird.
