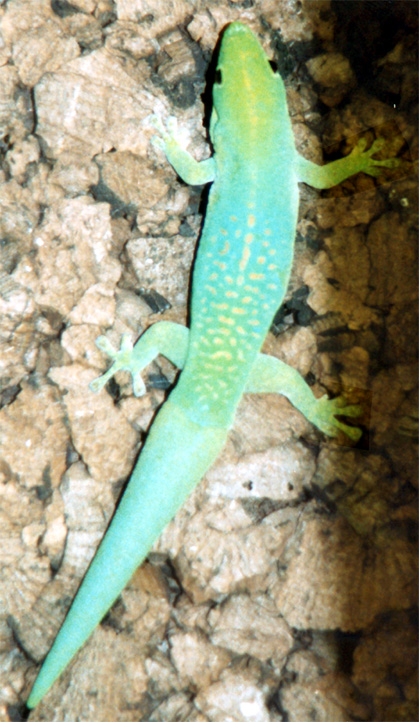

Scientific classification
- Kingdom: Animalia
- Phylum: Chordata
- Class: Reptilia
- Order: Squamata
- Suborder: Gekkota
- Family: Gekkonidae
- Genus: Phelsuma
- Species: P. v-nigra
- Subspecies: P. v. v-nigra

Trinomial name
- Phelsuma v-nigra v-nigra Boettger, 1913

= Phelsuma v-nigra v-nigra =

Subspecies of lizard

Phelsuma v-nigra v-nigra Boettger, 1913 (syn. Phelsuma v-nigra Kluge, 1993) is a small diurnal subspecies of geckos. It lives in the Comoros and typically inhabits trees and bushes. Phelsuma v-nigra v-nigra feeds on insects and nectar.

== Description ==
This lizard belongs to the smallest day geckos. It can reach a maximum length of approximately 10 cm. The body colour is bright green, which may have a blue hue. There is a red v-shaped stripe on the snout and two red bars between the eyes. On the back there often are a number of small red-brick coloured dots. The typical v-shaped marking on the throat may not be present in adults. The ventral side is yellow.

== Distribution ==
This species only inhabits the island Mohéli in the Comoros.

== Habitat ==
Phelsuma v-nigra v-nigra is found on banana trees and human dwellings.

== Diet ==
These day geckos feed on various insects and other invertebrates. They also like to lick soft, sweet fruit, pollen and nectar.

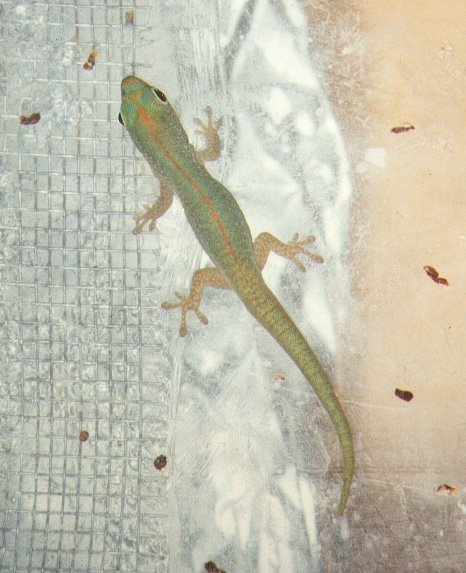
Phelsuma v-nigra v-nigra juvenile

== Reproduction ==
At a temperature of 28 °C, the young will hatch after approximately 45 days. The juveniles measure 35 mm.

== Care and maintenance in captivity ==
These animals should be housed in pairs and need a medium-sized, well planted terrarium. The daytime temperature should be between 28 and 30 °C and 24 and 26 °C at night. The humidity should be around 70%. A two-month winter cooldown should be included during which temperature is 25 °C at daytime and 20 °C at night. In captivity, these animals can be fed with crickets, wax moth larvae, fruit flies, mealworms and houseflies.
