= List of Falconidae =

Falconidae is a family of diurnal birds of prey and includes caracaras, laughing falcon, forest falcons, falconets, pygmy falcons, falcons and kestrels. They are small to medium-sized birds of prey, ranging in size from the black-thighed falconet, which can weigh as little as 35 grams (1.2 oz), to the gyrfalcon, which can weigh as much as 1,735 grams (61.2 oz). They have strongly hooked bills, sharply curved talons and excellent eyesight. The plumage is usually composed of browns, whites, chestnut, black and grey, often with barring of patterning. There is little difference in the plumage of males and females, although a few species have some sexual dimorphism in boldness of plumage. They differ from other Falconiformes in killing with their beaks instead of their talons. They have a "tooth" on the side of their beak for the purpose.

They are classified in eleven genera and 67 species of which two are extinct.

== Conventions ==
IUCN Red List categories
Conservation status
- EX: Extinct (2 species)
- EW: Extinct in the wild (0 species)
- CR: Critically endangered (0 species)
- EN: Endangered (2 species)
- VU: Vulnerable (5 species)
- NT: Near threatened (8 species)
- LC: Least concern (49 species)

Other categories
- DD: Data deficient (0 species)
- NE: Not evaluated (1 species)

Conservation statuses listed for each species follow the International Union for Conservation of Nature (IUCN) Red List of Threatened Species. The ▲ symbol indicates that the species's population trend is positive, the ▼ symbol indicates that the species's population trend is negative, the symbol indicates that the species's population is stable, and the symbol indicates that the species's population trend is unknown. Population trends are based on the Red List of Threatened Species. The super-scripted "IUCN" tag is a link to that species's Red List of Threatened Species page. If a species has taxonomic synonyms, a list of these is provided in the "Scientific name" column, underneath the binomial name and author. If a species has subspecies, a list of these is provided in the "Common name" column, underneath the common name.

== Classification ==
Family: Falconidae

- Subfamily Polyborinae
  - Genus Daptrius – black caracara
  - Genus Ibycter – red-throated caracara (sometimes included in Daptrius)
  - Genus Phalcoboenus (4 species) – Andean and southern South American caracaras
  - Genus Caracara – crested caracaras (2 living species, 1 extinct)
  - Genus Milvago – brown caracaras (2 species)
  - Genus Micrastur – forest falcons (7 species)
- Subfamily Falconinae
  - Genus Herpetotheres – laughing falcon
  - Genus Spiziapteryx – spot-winged falconet
  - Genus Polihierax – pygmy falcons (2 species, includes Neohierax)
  - Genus Microhierax – typical falconets (5 species)
  - Genus Falco – true falcons, hobbies and kestrels (around 37 species)

Following list of Falconidae is based on International Ornithological Congress' World Bird List.

== Subfamily Polyborinae ==
Traditionally, subfamily Polyborinae comprises caracaras and forest falcons which are principally birds of South and Central America. They are classified in six genera and 18 species of which one is extinct since 1906. Unlike the Falco falcons in the same family, caracaras in the five relevant genera are not fast-flying aerial hunters, but are comparatively slow and are often scavengers (a notable exception being the red-throated caracara).

=== Genus Daptrius ===
Genus Daptrius Vieillot, 1816 – 1 species

Common name	Scientific name	IUCN Red List Status	Range	Picture
Black caracara	D. ater Vieillot, 1816	aLC^{IUCN}	South America: Amazonia	

=== Genus Ibycter ===
Genus Ibycter Vieillot, 1816 – 1 species

Common name	Scientific name	IUCN Red List Status	Range	Picture
Red-throated caracara	I. americanus (Boddaert, 1783) Synonyms: Falco americanus Boddaert, 1783; Daptrius americanus (Boddaert, 1783)	aLC^{IUCN}▼	Central & South America : Southern Mexico to southern Brazil	

=== Genus Phalcoboenus ===
Genus Phalcoboenus d'Orbigny, 1834 - 4 species

Common name	Scientific name	IUCN Red List Status	Range	Picture
Carunculated caracara	P. carunculatus Des Murs, 1853	aLC^{IUCN}	South America: Ecuador, southwest Colombia	
Mountain caracara	P. megalopterus (Meyen, 1834)	aLC^{IUCN}	South America: Peru to central Chile	
White-throated caracara	P. albogularis (Gould, 1837)	aLC^{IUCN}	South America: Southern Chile, southern Argentina	
Striated caracara	P. australis (Gmelin, 1788)	bNT^{IUCN}	South America: Southern islands	

=== Genus Caracara ===
Genus Caracara Merrem, 1826 - 3 species

Common name	Scientific name	IUCN Red List Status	Range	Picture
Guadalupe caracara (Mourning caracara)	C. lutosa† (Ridgway, 1876) Synonyms: Polyborus plancus lutosus; Caracara plancus lutosus; Polyborus lutosus; Caracara lutosus	aEX^{IUCN}	Guadalupe Island, Mexico; Extinct probably since 1906	
Crested caracara (Carancho) (Carcará)	C. plancus (Miller, 1777) Synonyms: Polyborus plancus Miller, 1777	aLC^{IUCN}▲		

=== Genus Milvago ===
Genus Milvago Spix, 1824 - 2 species

Common name	Scientific name	IUCN Red List Status	Range	Picture
Yellow-headed caracara Subspecies: (Note: M. c. cordata southern Costa Rica through South America to the north of the Amazon; M. c. chimachima from south of the Amazon to northern Argentina): M. c. cordata Bangs & Penard, TE, 1918; M. c. chimachima (Vieillot, 1816)	M. chimachima (Vieillot, 1816) Synonyms: Polyborus chimachima (Vieillot, 1816); Falco readei (Brodkorb, 1959); Milvago readei (Brodkorb, 1959)	aLC^{IUCN}▲	Central & South America: Costa Rica to northern Argentina	
Chimango caracara Subspecies: (Note: M. c. chimango from southern Brazil, Uruguay, Paraguay to central Argentina and Chile; M. c. temucoensis from southern Argentina and Chile to Tierra del Fuego): M. c. chimango Vieillot, 1816; M. c. temucoensis W.L. Sclater, 1918)	M. chimango (Vieillot, 1816) Synonyms: Phalcoboenus chimango Ridgway, 1876	aLC^{IUCN}▲	South America : Southern Cone	

=== Genus Micrastur ===
Forest falcons are endemic to the Americas. They are classified as 7 species in one genus. They are adapted for agility in thick cover rather than outright speed in the open air. They have short wings, long tails, and extraordinarily acute hearing. While generally visually inconspicuous, their songs are commonly heard.

Genus Micrastur G.R. Gray, 1841 - 7 species

Common name	Scientific name	IUCN Red List Status	Range	Picture
Barred forest falcon Subspecies: (Note: M. r. guerilla from Mexico to Nicaragua; M. r. interstes from Costa Rica to western Colombia and Ecuador; M. r. zonothrax from eastern Colombia and northern Venezuela south to Bolivia; M. r. concentricus southern Venezuela, the Guianas, Amazonia; M. r. ruficollis eastern Brazil, Paraguay, north Argentina; M. r. olrogi northwestern Argentina): M. r. guerilla Cassin, 1848; M. r. interstes Bangs, 1907; M. r. zonothrax (Cabanis, 1866); M. r. concentricus (Lesson, 1830); M. r. ruficollis (Vieillot, 1817); M. r. olrogi Amadon, 1964	M. ruficollis (Vieillot, 1817)	aLC^{IUCN}▼	Central & South America: Southern Mexico to northern Argentina	
Plumbeous forest falcon	M. plumbeus W.L. Sclater, 1918	cVU^{IUCN}▼	Central & South America: Southwestern Colombia, northwestern Ecuador	
Lined forest falcon	M. gilvicollis (Vieillot, 1817)	aLC^{IUCN}▼	South America: Amazon rainforest	
Cryptic forest falcon	M. mintoni Whittaker, 2003	aLC^{IUCN}▼	South America: From eastern Amazon rainforest south to Bolivia	
Slaty-backed forest falcon	M. mirandollei (Schlegel, 1862)	aLC^{IUCN}▼	Central & South America: Costa Rica to eastern Brazil	
Collared forest falcon Subspecies: (Note: M. s. naso from Mexico to northwestern Peru; M. s. semitorquatus from eastern Colombia through the Guianas and Brazil to northern Argentina): M. s. naso (Lesson, 1830); M. s. semitorquatus (Vieillot, 1817)	M. semitorquatus (Vieillot, 1817)	aLC^{IUCN}▼	Central & South America: Central Mexico to northern Argentina	
Buckley's forest falcon	M. buckleyi Swann, 1919	aLC^{IUCN}▼	South America: Western Amazon rainforest	

== Subfamily Falconinae ==
=== Genus Herpethotheres ===
Genus Herpetotheres Vieillot, 1817 - 1 species

Common name	Scientific name	IUCN Red List Status	Range	Picture
Laughing falcon (Snake hawk) (Note: Erroneously called "snake hawk", since it is not a hawk) Subspecies: (Note: H. c. cachinnans from Mexico through central and eastern South America to northern Argentina; H. c. fulvescens from eastern Panama and northwestern Colombia to northwestern Peru): H. c. cachinnans (Linnaeus, 1758); H. c. fulvescens Chapman, 1915	H. cachinnans (Linnaeus, 1758) Synonyms: Falco cachinnans (Linnaeus, 1758); Falco sufflator (Linnaeus, 1758)	aLC^{IUCN}▼	Central & South America: from Mexico to northern Argentina	

=== Genus Spiziapteryx ===
Genus Spiziapteryx Kaup, 1852 - 1 species

Common name	Scientific name	IUCN Red List Status	Range	Picture
Spot-winged falconet	S. circumcincta (Kaup, 1852) Synonyms: 'Harpagus curcumcinctus' (Kaup, 1852)	aLC^{IUCN}	From southeastern Bolivia and western Paraguay to central Argentina	

=== Genus Polihierax ===
Genus Polihierax Kaup, 1847 - 2 species

Common name	Scientific name	IUCN Red List Status	Range	Picture
Pygmy falcon (African pygmy falcon) Subspecies: (Note: P. s. castanonotus from southern Sudan and Ethiopia to central Tanzania; P. s. semitorquatus from southern Angola to northwestern South Africa): P. s. castanonotus (Heuglin, 1860); P. s. semitorquatus (Smith, 1836)	P. semitorquatus (Smith, 1836)	aLC^{IUCN}	Eastern and southern Africa	
White-rumped falcon (White-rumped pygmy falcon) (White-rumped falconet) (Fielden's falconet) (Burmese pigmy falcon) Subspecies: (Note: P. i. insignis western and central Myanmar; P. i. cinereiceps southern Myanmar and northwestern Thailand; P. i. harmandi Laos, Vietnam, and Cambodia): P. i. insignis Walden, 1872; P. i. cinereiceps Baker, 1927; P. i. harmandi (Oustalet, 1876)	P. insignis Walden, 1872 (Note: It is sometimes placed in its own monotypic genus Neohierax) Synonyms: 'Neohierax insignis' (Walden, 1872)	bNT^{IUCN}▼	Southeast Asia	

=== Genus Microhierax ===
Genus Microhierax Sharpe, 1874 - 5 species

Common name	Scientific name	IUCN Red List Status	Range	Picture
Collared falconet Subspecies: (Note: M. c. caerulescens northern India and Nepal; M. c. burmanicus from Myanmar to Indochina): M. c. caerulescens Linnaeus, 1758; M. c. burmanicus Swann, 1920	M. caerulescens (Linnaeus, 1758) Synonyms: 'Falco caerulescens' (Linnaeus, 1758)	aLC^{IUCN}	From Northeast India through Southeast Asia	
Black-thighed falconet	M. fringillarius (Drapiez, 1824)	aLC^{IUCN}	Malay Peninsula, Greater Sundas	
White-fronted falconet (Bornean falconet)	M. latifrons Sharpe, 1879	bNT^{IUCN}▼	Borneo	
Philippine falconet Subspecies: (Note: M. e. erythrogenys northern Philippines; M. e. meridionalis southern Philippines): M. e. erythrogenys (Vigors, 1831); M. e. meridionalis Ogilvie-Grant, 1897	M. erythrogenys (Vigors, 1831)	aLC^{IUCN}▼	The Philippines	
Pied falconet	M. melanoleucos (Blyth, 1843) Synonyms: 'Microhierax melanoleucus' (Blyth, 1843) (Note: Error in species)	aLC^{IUCN}	from northeastern India to southern China and central Vietnam	

=== Genus Falco ===
Falcons are roughly divisible into three or four groups. The first contains the kestrels (probably excepting the American kestrel); the second group contains slightly larger (on average) and more elegant species, the hobbies and relatives. Third are the peregrine falcon and its relatives: variably sized powerful birds which also have a black malar area (except some very light color morphs), and often a black cap also. Very similar to these and sometimes included therein are the four or so species of hierofalcons (literally, "hawk-falcons").

Genus Falco Linnaeus, 1758 - 40 species

Common name	Scientific name	IUCN Red List Status	Range	Picture
Lesser kestrel	F. naumanni Fleischer, 1818	aLC^{IUCN}	Southwestern, central and eastern Europe and Africa	
Common kestrel (European kestrel) (Eurasian kestrel) (Old World kestrel) Subspecies: (Note: F. t. tinnunculus from Europe and northwestern Africa to Siberia; F. t. perpallidus from northeastern Siberia to northeastern China and Korea;F. t. interstinctus from Himalayas to Japan and Indochina; F. t. objurgatus southern India, Sri Lanka; F. t. canariensis Madeira and western Canary Islands; F. t. dacotiae eastern Canary Islands; F. t. neglectus northern Cape Verde Island; F. t. alexandri southern Cape Verde Island; F. t. rupicolaeformis northeastern Africa and Arabia; F. t. archeri Socotra Island, Somalia, northeastern Kenya; F. t. rufescens from West Africa to Ethiopia south to northern Angola and Tanzania): F. t. tinnunculus Linnaeus, 1758; F. t. perpallidus (Clark, 1907); F. t. interstinctus McClelland, 1840; F. t. objurgatus (Baker, 1929); F. t. canariensis (Koenig, 1890); F. t. dacotiae Hartert, 1913; F. t. neglectus Schlegel, 1873; F. t. alexandri Bourne, 1955; F. t. rupicolaeformis (C. L. Brehm, 1855); F. t. archeri (Hartert & Neumann, 1932); F. t. rufescens Swainson, 1837	F. tinnunculus Linnaeus, 1758 Synonyms: F. t. interstictus (Note: lapsus)	aLC^{IUCN}▼	Widespread in Europe, Africa and Asia	
Rock kestrel	F. rupicolus (Note: Falco rupicolus is split from F. tinnunculus ( Hockey, Dean & Ryan, eds. 2005)); Daudin, 1800	iNE	Southern Africa	
Malagasy kestrel (Madagascar kestrel) (Malagasy spotted kestrel) (Newton's kestrel) (Madagascar spotted kestrel) Subspecies: (Note: F. n. newtoni Madagascar; F. n. aldabranus Aldabra and Anjouan Islands): F. n. newtoni Gurney, 1863; F. n. aldabranus Grote, 1928	F. newtoni Gurney, 1863	aLC^{IUCN}▲	Madagascar, Aldabra Island	
Mauritius kestrel	F. punctatus Temminck, 1821	dEN^{IUCN}▼	Mauritius	
Reunion kestrel	F. duboisi† Cowles, 1994	aEX^{IUCN}	Réunion, extinct since c.1700	
Seychelles kestrel	F. araea (Oberholser, 1917)	cVU^{IUCN}	Seychelles Islands	
Spotted kestrel (Moluccan kestrel) Subspecies: (Note: F. m. moluccensis northern and southern Moluccas; F. m. microbalius Java to Lesser Sundas, Sulawesi and Tanimbar Islands): F. m. moluccensis Bonaparte, 1850; F. m. microbalius Oberholser, 1917	F. moluccensis (Bonaparte, 1850)	aLC^{IUCN}▲	Moluccas, Sulawesi, Lesser Sundas, Java and Bali	
Nankeen kestrel Subspecies: (Note: F. c. baru Snow Mountains (New Guinea); F. c. cenchroides Australia, Tasmania, Lord Howe Island, Norfolk Islands): F. c. baru Rand, 1940; F. c. cenchroides Vigors & Horsfield, 1827	F. cenchroides Vigors & Horsfield, 1827	aLC^{IUCN}▲	Widespread in Australia	
American kestrel Subspecies: (Note: F. s. sparverius Alaska and Canada through the USA to western Mexico; F. s. paulus southeastern USA; F. s. peninsularis northwestern Mexico; F. s. tropicalis southern Mexico to northern Honduras; F. s. nicaraguensis northwesternw Honduras, Nicaragua; F. s. sparverioides Bahamas, Cuba; F. s. dominicensis Hispaniola; F. s. caribaearum Puerto Rico to Grenada (West Indies); F. s. brevipennis Aruba, Curaçao, Bonaire (Netherlands Antilles); F. s. isabellinus eastern Venezuela, the Guianas, northern Brazil;F. s. ochraceus eastern Colombia, northwestern Venezuela; F. s. caucae western Colombia; F. s. aequatorialis northern Ecuador; F. s. peruvianus southwestern Ecuador, Peru, northern Chile; F. s. cinnamominus southeastern Peru to Paraguay, southeastern Brazil (Rio Grande do Sul) and Tierra del Fuego; F. s. fernandensis Alejandro Selkirk and Juan Fernandez Islands (Chile); F. s. cearae southern Brazil): F. s. sparverius Linnaeus, 1758; F. s. paulus (Howe & King, L, 1902); F. s. peninsularis Mearns, 1892; F. s. tropicalis (Griscom, 1930); F. s. nicaraguensis Howell, 1965; F. s. sparverioides Vigors, 1827; F. s. dominicensis Gmelin, 1788; F. s. caribaearum Gmelin, 1788; F. s. brevipennis Berlepsch, 1892); F. s. isabellinus Swainson, 1838; F. s. ochraceus (Cory, 1915); F. s. caucae (Chapman, 1915); F. s. aequatorialis Mearns, 1892; F. s. peruvianus (Cory, 1915); F. s. cinnamominus Swainson, 1838; F. s. fernandensis (Chapman, 1915); F. s. cearae (Cory, 1915)	F. sparverius Linnaeus, 1758	aLC^{IUCN}	Widespread in North, Central and South America	
Greater kestrel (White-eyed kestrel) Subspecies: (Note: F. r. fieldi northeastern Ethiopia, northern Somalia, northern Kenya; F. r. arthuri central and southern Kenya, northeastern Tanzania; F. r. rupicoloides southern Angola to southwestern Zambia south to South Africa): F. r. fieldi (Elliot, 1897); F. r. arthuri (Gurney, 1884); F. r. rupicoloides Smith, 1829	F. rupicoloides Smith, 1829	aLC^{IUCN}	Eastern and southern Africa	
Fox kestrel	F. alopex (Heuglin, 1861)	aLC^{IUCN}	Mauritania, Senegal and Gambia to Sudan, Ethiopia and Kenya	
Grey kestrel	F. ardosiaceus Vieillot, 1823	aLC^{IUCN}	Senegal and Gambia to Ethiopia south to Tanzania and west to Angola and Namibia	
Dickinson's kestrel (White-rumped kestrel)	F. dickinsoni Sclater, 1864	aLC^{IUCN}	Angola and Namibia to central Kenya and northern Mozambique	
Banded kestrel (Madagascar banded kestrel) (Barred kestrel) (Madagascar barred kestrel)	F. zoniventris Peters, 1854	aLC^{IUCN}	Madagascar	
Red-necked falcon Subspecies: (Note: F. c. chicquera southeastern Iran through India to Bangladesh; F. c. ruficollis Senegal to western Ethiopia, eastern Africa to northeastern Zimbabwe and central Mozambique; F. c. horsbrughi Namibia, Botswana, western Zimbabwe and northern, northwestern South Africa): F. c. chicquera Daudin, 1800; F. c. ruficollis Swainson, 1837; F. c. horsbrughi Gunning & Roberts, 1911	F. chicquera Daudin, 1800 Synonyms: Turumtia chicquera Blyth, 1863; Chicquera typus Bonaparte,1854; Aesalon chicquera Blanford, 1895	bNT^{IUCN}▼	Central, western and southern Africa, India	
Red-footed falcon	F. vespertinus Linnaeus, 1766	bNT^{IUCN}▼	Central Europe to central Asia, Africa	
Amur falcon	F. amurensis Radde, 1863	aLC^{IUCN}	Eastern Asia, southeastern Africa	
Eleonora's falcon	F. eleonorae Gené, 1839	aLC^{IUCN}▲	Southern Europe and also northern Africa, eastern Africa, Madagascar	
Sooty falcon	F. concolor Temminck, 1825	cVU^{IUCN}▼	Eastern Libya to southwestern Pakistan, southeast Africa, Madagascar	
Aplomado falcon Subspecies: (Note: F. f. septentrionalis southwwstern USA to Honduras; F. f. femoralis Nicaragua through South America to Tierra del Fuego; F. f. pichinchae Andes from Colombia to northern Chile and northwestern Argentina): F. f. septentrionalis Todd, 1916; F. f. femoralis Temminck, 1822; F. f. pichinchae Chapman, 1925	F. femoralis Temminck, 1822	aLC^{IUCN}▼	Widespread in Central & South America	
Merlin Subspecies: (Note: F. c. subaesalon Iceland; F. c. aesalon Europe to northwestern Siberia; F. c. insignis northern and central Siberia; F. c. pacificus northeastern Asia; F. c. pallidus steppes of western and central Asia; F. c. lymani mountains of eastern and central Asia; F. c. columbarius Alaska to Newfoundland to northern USA; F. c. suckleyi southeastern Alaska to northern Washington (USA); F. c. richardsonii central and southern Canada to northern central USA): F. c. subaesalon Brehm, 1827; F. c. aesalon Tunstall, 1771; F. c. insignis (Clark, 1907); F. c. pacificus (Stegmann, 1929); F. c. pallidus (Sushkin, 1900); F. c. lymani Bangs, 1913; F. c. columbarius Linnaeus, 1758; F. c. suckleyi Ridgway, 1874; F. c. richardsonii Ridgway, 1871	F. columbarius Linnaeus, 1758 Synonyms: Aesalon columbarius (Linnaeus, 1758); F. aesalon Tunstall, 1771	aLC^{IUCN}	Widespread in Northern Hemisphere	
Bat falcon Subspecies: (Note: F. r. petoensis Mexico to western Ecuador; F. r. rufigularis eastern Colombia through the Guianas to southern Brazil and northeastern Argentina; F. r. ophryophanes eastern Bolivia to southern Brazil, Paraguay and northwestern Argentina): F. r. petoensis Chubb, 1918; F. r. rufigularis Daudin, 1800; F. r. ophryophanes (Salvadori, 1895)	F. rufigularis Daudin, 1800 Synonyms: F. albigularis Daudin, 1800; F. fuscocaerulescens Vieillot, 1817 (modern spelling); F. fusco-coerulescens Vieillot, 1817 (original spelling)	aLC^{IUCN}▼	Northern Mexico to northeastern Argentina	
Orange-breasted falcon	F. deiroleucus Temminck, 1825	bNT^{IUCN}▼	Southern Mexico to northeastern Argentina	
Eurasian hobby Subspecies: (Note: F. s. subbuteo Europe to Japan to northern India and central China; F. s. streichi Myanmar to southern China and northern Indochina): F. s. subbuteo Linnaeus, 1758; F. s. streichi Hartert & Neumann, 1907	F. subbuteo Linnaeus, 1758	aLC^{IUCN}▼	Widespread in Europe, southern Africa, northern Asia	
African hobby	F. cuvierii Smith, 1830	aLC^{IUCN}▼	Eastern, central, western and southeastern Africa	
Oriental hobby	F. severus Horsfield, 1821	aLC^{IUCN}▼	Northwestern India to Solomon Islands	
Australian hobby (Little falcon) Subspecies: (Note: F. l. hanieli Lesser Sundas; F. l. longipennis southwestern and southeastern Australia, Tasmania; F. l. murchisonianus Australia except southwestern and southeastern): F. l. hanieli Hellmayr, 1914; F. l. longipennis Swainson, 1838; F. l. murchisonianus Mathews, 1912	F. longipennis Swainson, 18371	aLC^{IUCN}▲	Widespread in Australia	
New Zealand falcon	F. novaeseelandiae Gmelin, 1788	bNT^{IUCN}▼	Widespread in New Zealand	
Brown falcon Subspecies: (Note: F. b. novaeguineae central and eastern New Guinea, coastal northern Australia; F. b. berigora Australia (except coastal north) and Tasmania): F. b. novaeguineae (Meyer, AB, 1894); F. b. berigora Vigors & Horsfield, 1827	F. berigora Vigors & Horsfield, 1827 Synonyms: Asturaetus furcillatus De Vis, 1906; Plioaetus furcillatus (De Vis, 1906)	aLC^{IUCN}▼	Widespread in Australia	
Grey falcon	F. hypoleucos Gould, 1841	cVU^{IUCN}	Australia	
Black falcon	F. subniger Gray, 1843	aLC^{IUCN}	Australia	
Lanner falcon Subspecies: (Note: F. b. feldeggii Italy to Turkey, Azerbaijan and northwestern Iran; F. b. erlangeri northwestern Africa; F. b. tanypterus northeastern Africa to Arabia, Israel and Iraq; F. b. abyssinicus southern Mauritania to Ethiopia and Somalia south to Cameroon and northern Kenya; F. b. biarmicus Democratic Republic of the Congo to southern Kenya south to South Africa): F. b. feldeggii Schlegel, 1843; F. b. erlangeri Kleinschmidt, 1901; F. b. tanypterus Schlegel, 1843; F. b. abyssinicus Neumann, 1904; F. b. biarmicus Temminck, 1825	F. biarmicus Temminck, 1825 Synonyms: F. feldeggii Schlegel, 1841; F. lanarius Linnaeus, 1758	aLC^{IUCN}▲	Southern Europe, Arabian Peninsula, and widespread in Africa	
Laggar falcon	F. jugger J.E. Gray, 1834	bNT^{IUCN}▼	Pakistan to Burma, India	
Saker falcon Subspecies: (Note: F. c. cherrug central Europe to southern central Siberia and northern Kazakhstan; F. c. coatsi central Asia to southern Siberia and northern China; F. c. hendersoni western and southern Kazakhstan, Uzbekistan; F. c. milvipes Himalayas to Tibet): F. c. cherrug Gray, JE, 1834; F. c. coatsi Dementiev, 1945; F. c. hendersoni Hume, 1871; F. c. milvipes Jerdon, 1871	F. cherrug Gray, 1834 Synonyms: F. altaicus (Menzbier, 1891); Hierofalco altaicus Menzbier, 1891	dEN^{IUCN}▼	Central and southern Europe, northeastern Africa and northern Asia	
Gyrfalcon	F. rusticolus Linnaeus, 1758 Synonyms: F. arcticus Holbøll, 1843; F. candicans Gmelin, 1788; F. gyrfalco Linnaeus, 1758; F. islandus Brünnich, 1764; F. obsoletus Gmelin, 1788; F. rusticolus candicans Gmelin, 1788; F. rusticolus grebnitzkii (Severtzov, 1885); F. rusticolus intermedius Gloger, 1834; F. rusticolus islandus Brünnich, 1764; F. rusticolus obsoletus Gmelin, 1788; F. rusticolus rusticolus Linnaeus, 1758; F. swarthi L.H. Miller, 1927; Hierofalco grebnitzkii Severtzov, 1885); Hierofalco islandus (Brünnich, 1764); Hierofalco rusticolus (Linnaeus, 1758); Hierofalco rusticolus candicans (Gmelin, 1788)	aLC^{IUCN}	Arctic coasts of Northern America, Europe and Asia	
Prairie falcon	F. mexicanus Schlegel, 1850 Synonyms: Gennaia mexicana; Hierofalco mexicanus	aLC^{IUCN}▲	North America	
Peregrine falcon	Falco peregrinus Tunstall, 1771	aLC^{IUCN}	Widespread worldwide	
Barbary falcon	Falco pelegrinoides Temminck, 1829	aLC^{IUCN}	Southwestern Europe and northern Africa	
Taita falcon	Falco fasciinucha Reichenow & Neumann, 1895	cVU^{IUCN}▼	Eastern and southeastern Africa	

== Bibliography ==
- Gill, F.; Donsker, D.; Rasmussen, P, eds. (2020). "Seriemas, falcons". IOC World Bird List (v10.1). doi:10.14344/IOC.ML.10.1.
- Thayer, John; Bangs, Outram (1908). "The Present State of the Ornis of Guadaloupe Island" (PDF). Condor. 10 (3): 101–106. doi:10.2307/1360977. hdl:2027/hvd.32044072250186. JSTOR 1360977. Archived from the original (PDF) on 2012-02-05.
