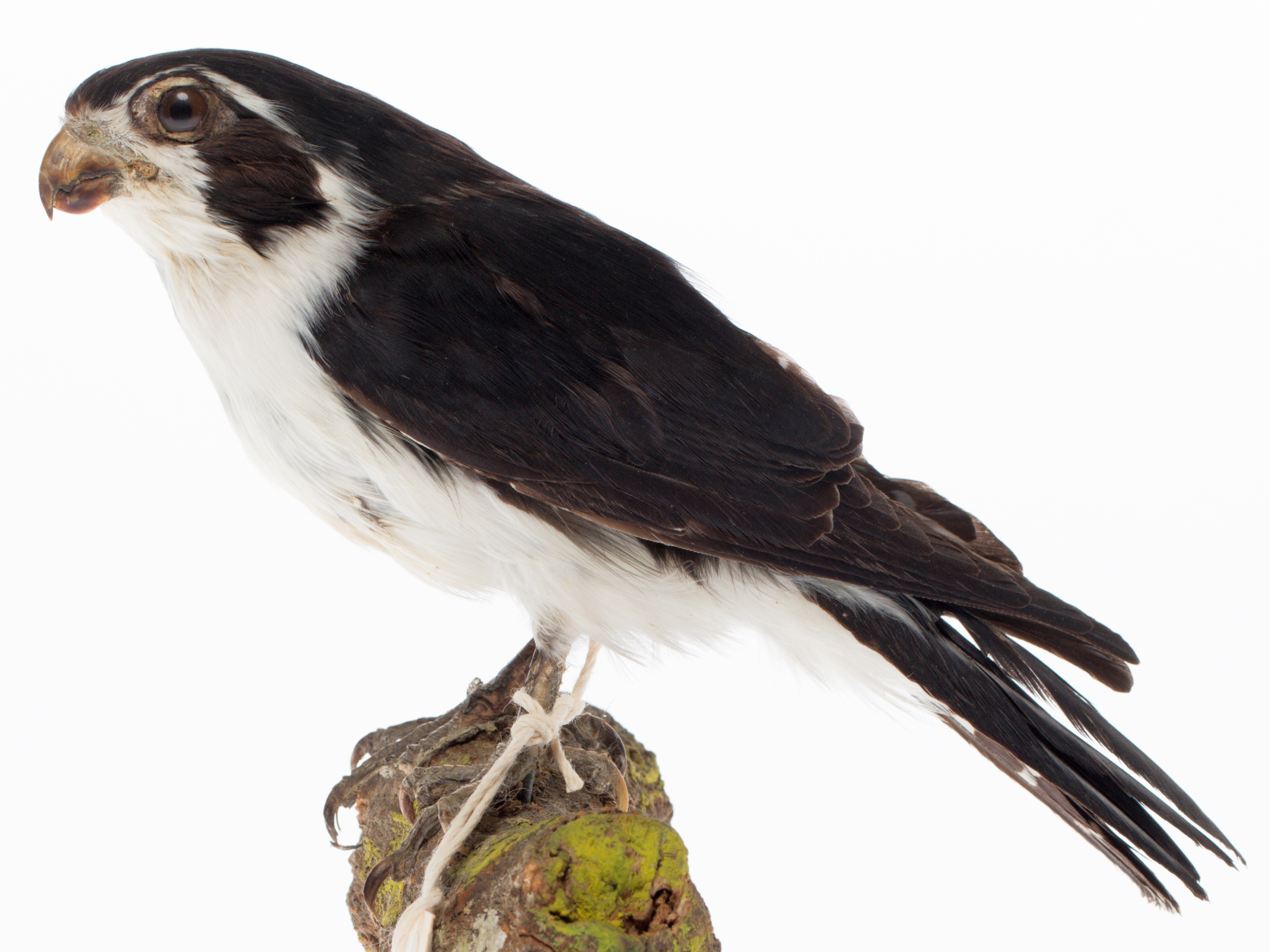
- Taxidermied specimen in Auckland Museum, collected in 1902 from Margherita, Assam, India

Conservation status
- Least Concern (IUCN 3.1)

Scientific classification
- Kingdom: Animalia
- Phylum: Chordata
- Class: Aves
- Order: Falconiformes
- Family: Falconidae
- Genus: Microhierax
- Species: M. melanoleucos

Binomial name
- Microhierax melanoleucos (Blyth, 1843)

Synonyms
- Microhierax melanoleucus (Blyth, 1843) ( error species.)

= Pied falconet =

Species of bird

The pied falconet, (Microhierax melanoleucos) is a species of bird of prey in the family Falconidae. It is found in Bangladesh, Bhutan, China, Hong Kong, India, Laos, and Vietnam. Its natural habitat is temperate forests.

These raptors belong to the genus Microhierax, which includes the smallest bird of prey species in the world. The pied falconet, also known as the white-legged falconet, nests in old woodpecker cavities. The species is listed as least concern because of its large home range and stable population size.

== Description ==
The pied falconet is a small black and white raptor, measuring between 7 and 7 ½ inches and weighing between 55 and 75 grams (2.6 oz). However, it is still larger than the other members of the genus Microhierax. Its face is white with a prominent black patch covering the eyes reaching to the ear coverts. The upper parts, including the crown, are completely black. The primaries are black with white wing bars. Its long tail has black upper parts and is black with white bars from below. The pied falconet displays no sexual dimorphism, and the juveniles strongly resemble adult males.

The five species belonging to the genus Microhierax are the smallest members of the order Falconiformes. While they have a very distinct morphology compared to other birds of prey, within the genus Microhierax, they are quite similar. These are allopatric species, except for M. fringillarius and M. latifrons, and mostly likely play very similar ecological roles in each of the habitats as a result of the morphological similarities within the genus. M. melanoleucos is distinguishable from these other members by its white thighs and the lack of chestnut coloration. They are sometimes mistaken for ashy woodswallow (Artamus fuscus); however, the pied falconet has blacker upper parts compared to the grey-ash color seen on the ashy woodswallow.

== Taxonomy ==
The pied falconet belongs to the family Falconidae of the order Falconiformes. The family Falconidae is split into two subfamilies, the Herpetotherinae and the Falconinae. The subfamily Falconinae is then also split into two tribes. The Caracini include five Neotropical genera: Daptrius, Ibycter, Milvago, Caracara and Phalcoboenus. The Falconini include the genera Polihierax, Falco, Spiziaptteryx and Microhierax. The species belonging to the genera Polihierax and Microhierax are the smallest diurnal raptors in the world. The pied falconet is one of the five species in the genus Microhierax. The four other species of this genus are:

- Collared falconet, Microhierax caerulescens
- Black-thighed falconet, Microhierax fringillarius
- White-fronted falconet, Microhierax latifrons
- Philippine falconet, Microhierax erythrogenys

== Habitat and distribution ==
The pied falconet ranges from north-eastern India to east China and south-east Asia. They are found in deciduous forest edges and clearings in wooded foothills. This species likes clearing such as old cultivation lands with banks and stream. They are usually perched on tree tops while occasionally flying off to catch prey. These are not migratory birds, they are a resident species, staying in the same area for most of the year.

== Behavior ==
=== Vocalization ===
This species produces a shrill, high pitched scream and chattering whistle. During the breeding season, the male will produce a rapid sequence of calls to the female as a courtship behavior before mating. The call starts as high-pitched and excited and then slows until the female decides to mate. Afterwards, the male will continue to call for a few more seconds.

=== Diet ===
Insects comprise most of the pied falconet's diet, but it also includes small mammals, reptiles and birds. A falconet catches its prey while flying over it and catching it mid-flight or by plucking it out of the foliage of the surrounding trees. Despite being small, pied falconets are quite fast and powerful, allowing them to catch prey as big as themselves or slightly larger.

=== Reproduction ===
The pied falconet's breeding season is from March until May. In the early breeding season, the males will initiate interest in mating to a female by presenting leaves to them. The male flies off and returns to a perched female and presents a leaf that he has gathered for the female. Later in the breeding season, usually before copulation, the males will bob up and down very frequently in front of the female while calling frantically. Copulation takes place after this behavior. These small raptors nest in old barbet or woodpecker holes and lay their eggs on a bed of leaves or grass. There have also been recordings of the nesting cavities being filled with insect remains instead of leaves. The females lay three to four eggs which are white in color.

The pied falconet shares many similarities in courtship and mating behavior with the collared falconet (Microhierax caerulescens). The leaf presenting courtship behavior was first observed in the collared falconet. The collared falconet is also known to breed cooperatively. Cooperative breeding is another behavior that is also suspected for the black-thighed falconet (Microhierax fringillarius) and for the other Microhierax species. The pied falconet can be seen in groups of 5 or 6 which suggest that they may also breed cooperatively.

== Gallery ==
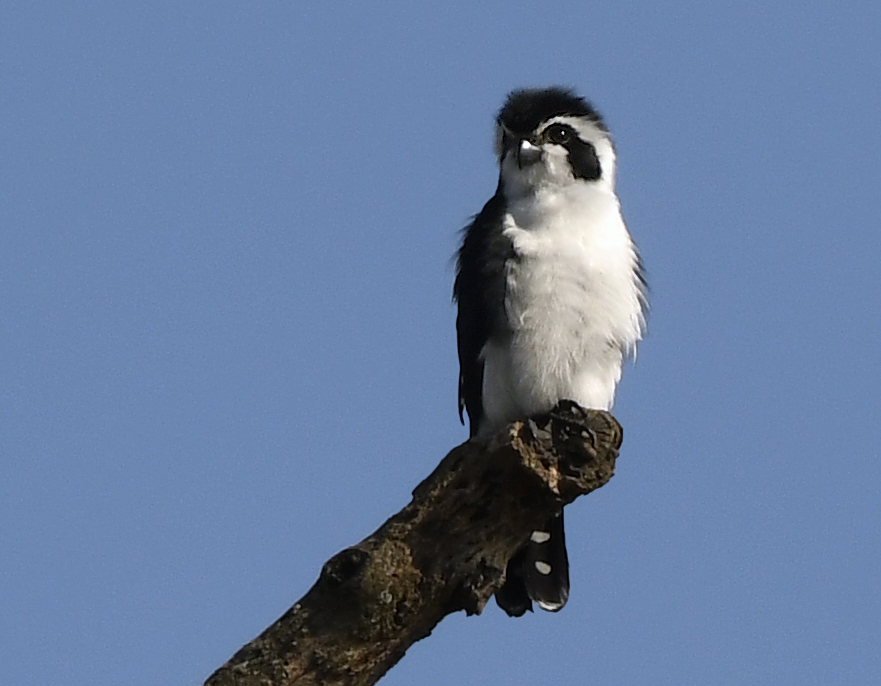
Kaziranga National Park, Assam, India

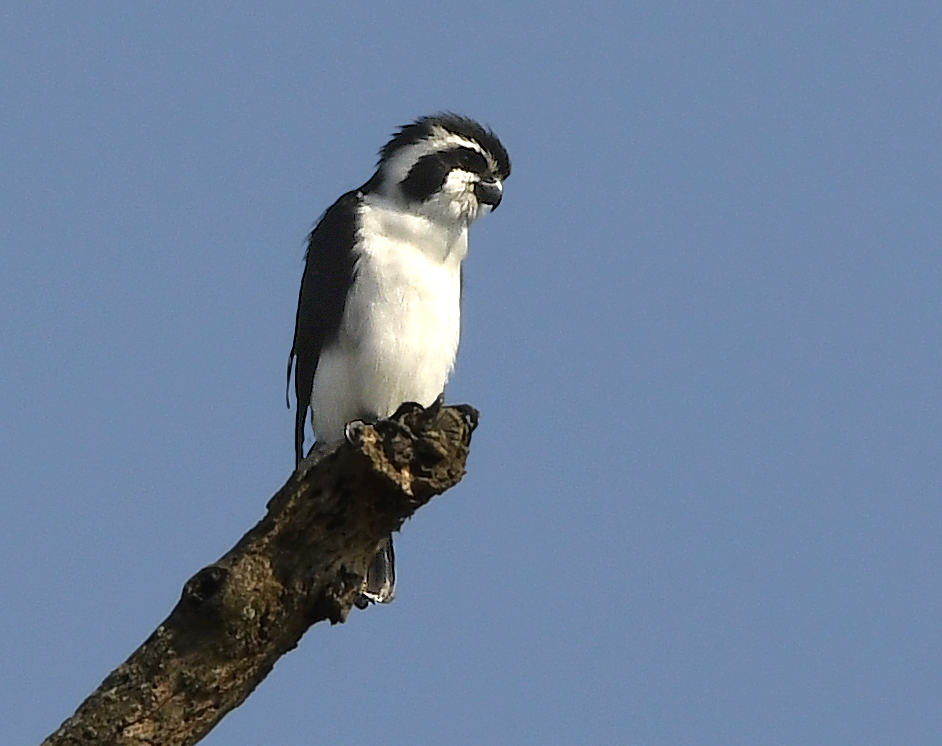
Kaziranga National Park, Assam, India

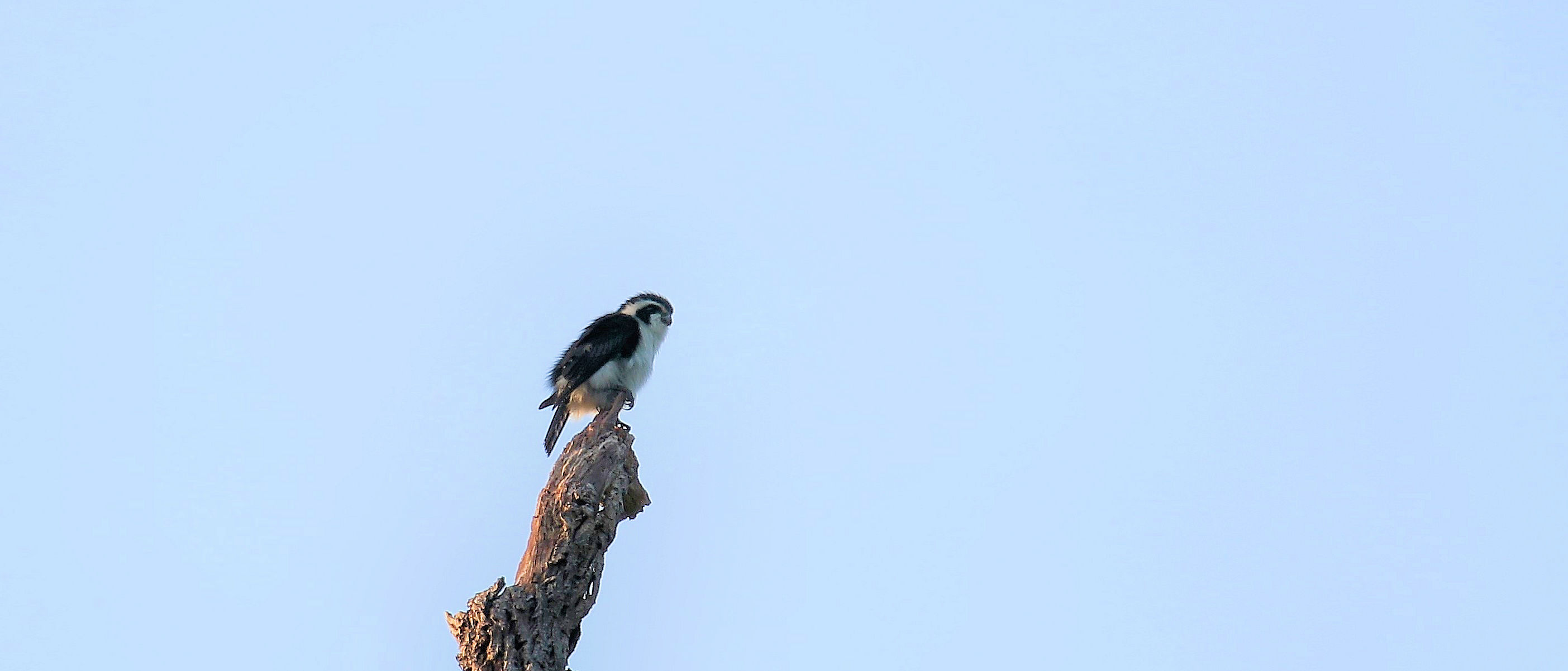
Cúc Phương National Park, Ninh Bình province, Vietnam
