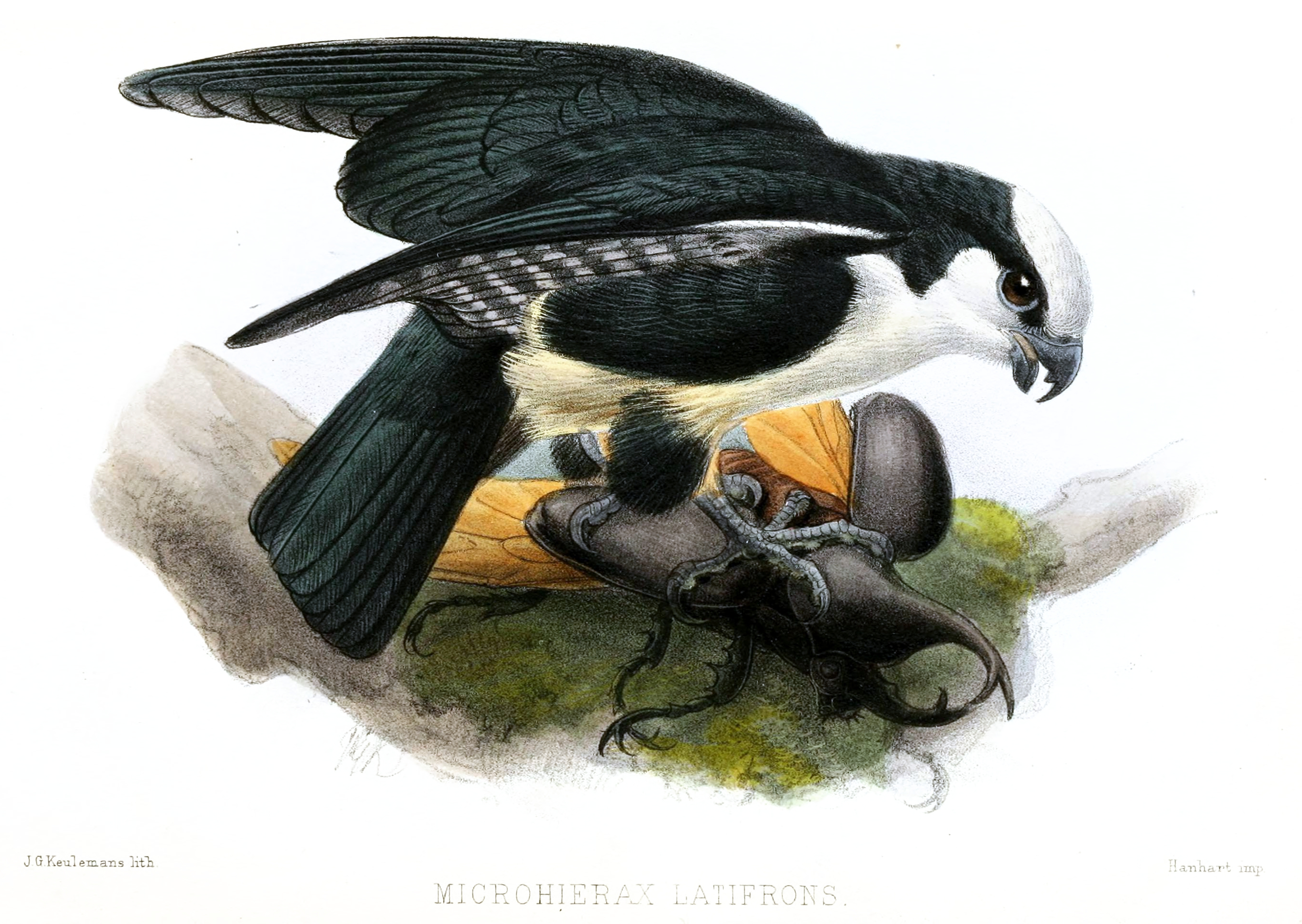

Conservation status
- Near Threatened (IUCN 3.1)
- CITES Appendix II

Scientific classification
- Kingdom: Animalia
- Phylum: Chordata
- Class: Aves
- Order: Falconiformes
- Family: Falconidae
- Genus: Microhierax
- Species: M. latifrons

Binomial name
- Microhierax latifrons Sharpe, 1879

= White-fronted falconet =

Species of bird

The white-fronted falconet (Microhierax latifrons), also called the Bornean falconet, is a species of bird of prey in the family Falconidae. Described by the British ornithologist Richard Bowdler Sharpe in 1879, it is endemic to Borneo, where it is found in Sarawak, Sabah, and extreme northeastern Kalimantan. An extremely small falcon, it is only 14–17 cm (5.5–6.7 in) long and weighs 35–65 g (1.2–2.3 oz), being the smallest species of falconet. It has glossy bluish-black upperparts, black flanks and outer thighs, and a black mask. The belly and vent are pale yellowish-brown, while the throat, cheeks, and breast are white. The species can be told apart from other falconets by the colour of its crown and forehead, which is white in males and reddish-brown in females. It has no subspecies.

The species inhabits open forests, forest edges, clearings with dead trees, and cultivated regions with interspersed trees, and rarely in mangrove forests. It mainly eats insects, although it has also been reported hunting birds. The breeding season lasts from March to either June or April, with clutches of two eggs being laid in old barbet or woodpecker nest holes. It is classified as being near threatened by the International Union for Conservation of Nature and is also listed on Appendix II of CITES. Threats to the species include deforestation, forest fires, and the cage-bird trade.

== Taxonomy and systematics ==
The white-fronted falconet was first described as Microhierax latifrons by the British ornithologist Richard Bowdler Sharpe in 1879 on the basis of specimens from the Lawas River and Lumbidan in Borneo. The generic name Microhierax is from the Ancient Greek mikros, meaning small, and hierax, meaning hawk. The specific name latifrons is from the Latin latus, meaning wide or broad, and frons, meaning forehead. White-fronted falconet is the official common name designated by the International Ornithologists' Union.

The white-fronted falconet is one of five species in the falconet genus Microhierax, which is found in Southeast Asia, South Asia, and the Philippines. A 2004 study of mitochondrial and nuclear DNA by Carole Griffiths and colleagues found that within the family Falconidae, the falconets were mostly closely related to the pygmy falcons (Polihierax). These two genera are further sister to the falcons of the genus Falco. No subspecies of the white-fronted falconet are recognised.

== Description ==
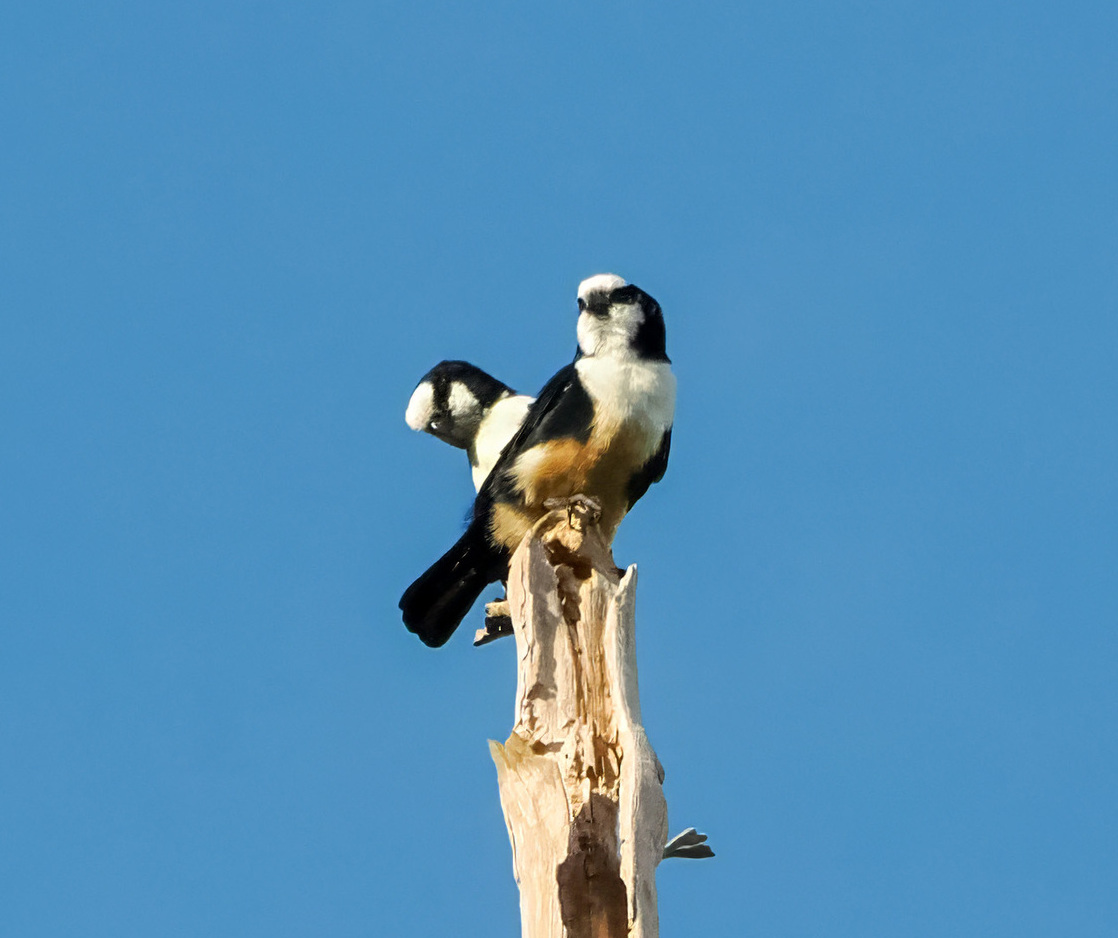
Male white-fronted falconets

The white-fronted falconet is an extremely small shrike-like species of falcon, with a length of 14–17 cm (5.5–6.7 in), a mass of 35–65 g (1.2–2.3 oz), and a wingspan of 28–31 cm (11–12 in). It is similar to other falconets, but is the smallest by a small amount. Both sexes have glossy bluish-black upperparts, black flanks and outer thighs, and a black mask. The throat, cheeks, and breast are white, changing to pale yellowish-brown on the belly and vent. The tail is short and black, with the wings reaching halfway to its tip. Males have a white forecrown and forehead, while females have this region reddish-brown. Females are also 9 per cent larger in size and have 4 per cent longer tails. In both sexes, the eyes are brown and the cere and legs are dark grey to black. Juveniles are similar to females, but have tawny-buff forecrowns and cheeks, while young females may also show reddish-brown on the forecrown.

The species may be confused with the black-thighed falconet, with which its range overlaps, but can be told apart from the latter and all other falconets by the colour of its forehead. The black-thighed falconet also has more intense reddish-brown on the belly and vent, along with white bars on the underside of the tail, which is pure black in the white-fronted falconet.

The white-fronted falconet's vocalizations are not well-known, but are assumed to be similar to those of other falconets. It makes a quavering kree-kree-kree.

== Distribution and habitat ==
The white-fronted falconet is endemic to Borneo, where it is found in the Malaysian states of Sarawak and Sabah, along with the extreme northeastern part of Kalimantan (the Indonesian portion of Borneo). It inhabits open forests, forest edges, clearings with dead trees, and cultivated regions with interspersed trees, and is thought to be especially common on mountainous slopes. It is also infrequently found in mangrove forests. The species is found at elevations of 0–1,200 m (0–3,937 ft).

== Behaviour and ecology ==
The white-fronted falconet is found alone or in groups of several individuals. The generation length in the species is 3.2 years.

The species mainly feeds on insects such as dragonflies, bees, and cicadas, but has also been reported chasing birds. Hunting parties have been observed in November. The species have been observed hunting from perches, making flights to catch flying insects and then eating the prey around two minutes after returning to the perch. Other hunting behaviours are thought to be similar to those of other falconets, although there may be differences in the hunting techniques of the present species and the black-thighed falconet.

The breeding season of the white-fronted falconet is thought to be either from March to June or from March to April, although breeding has also been observed in November. In Sabah, a male was seen feeding a fully-fledged chick in late July. Nesting occurs in old barbet or woodpecker nest holes, with clutches comprising two eggs. The incubation and fledging times are unknown. Adult males have been observed preening each other, but it is not known if it breeds communally like the collared falconet.

== Status ==
The white-fronted falconet is classified as being near threatened by the International Union for Conservation of Nature (IUCN) on the IUCN Red List, due to its small range, a moderately small population that is declining, and habitat loss within its range. It is also listed on Appendix II of CITES. The species' total population is estimated to be 15,000–30,000 total individuals, out of which 10,000–19,999 are adults. The population is estimated to be declining at a rate of 10–19% over a decade. Extensive deforestation in lowlands throughout its range, along with forest fires, is a threat, although the presence of the species in areas of secondary growth shows a degree of resistance may imply that it is not immediately threatened. The cage-bird trade may also pose a threat to the species.
