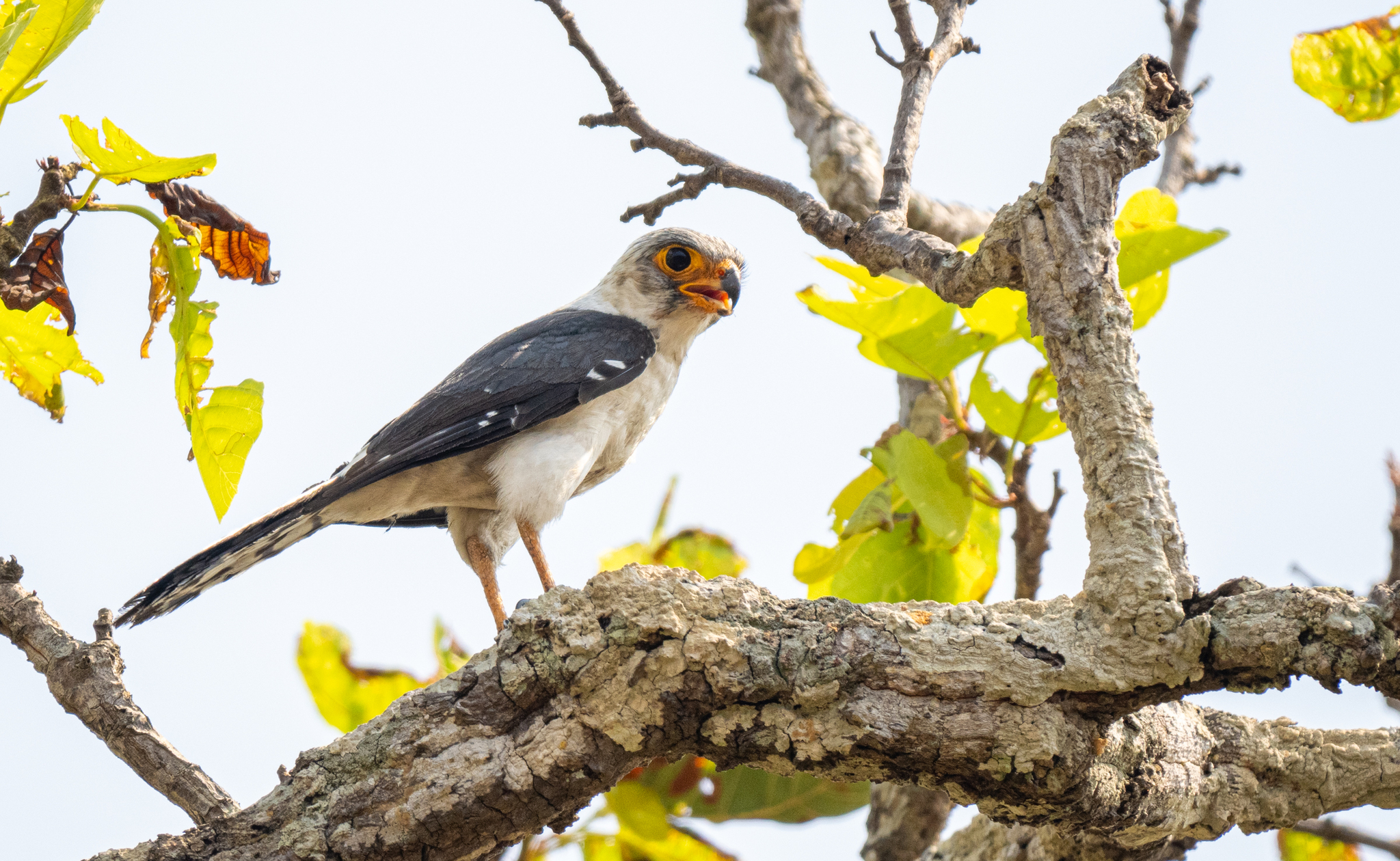

Conservation status
- Near Threatened (IUCN 3.1)

Scientific classification
- Kingdom: Animalia
- Phylum: Chordata
- Class: Aves
- Order: Falconiformes
- Family: Falconidae
- Subfamily: Falconinae
- Genus: Neohierax; Swann, 1922
- Species: N. insignis

Binomial name
- Neohierax insignis (Walden, 1872)

Synonyms
- Polihierax insignis

= White-rumped falcon =

Species of bird

The white-rumped falcon (Neohierax insignis) is a species of bird of prey in the family Falconidae native to Indochina. It is placed in its own monotypic genus, Neohierax.

== Taxonomy and naming ==
Philip Sclater, secretary of the Zoological Society of London, presented two skins at the meeting of 7 November 1871, on behalf of the society's president Arthur Hay, Viscount Walden. A brief account of this presentation was published in 1872, becoming the first formal description of the species.

In 1922, Harry Kirke Swann proposed a new monotypic genus for this bird, Neohierax. During the 20th century, most taxonomic authorities retained it in Polyhierax, though Brown and Amadon supported separating the two genera. Phylogenetic analyses of morphological characteristics found the white-rumped falcon to be basal to the Falco clade, but separate from the clade containing the pygmy falcon (or African pigmy falcon, Polihierax semitorquatus) and Microhierax (falconets or pigmy falcons).

Research in molecular genetics has also found that the white-rumped falcon is more closely related to the Falco falcons than it is to the pygmy falcon, and indicates two major clades within the extant members of the falcon subfamily, Falconinae. Boyd places the Microhierax falconets with the pygmy falcon in tribe Polihieracini, and the white-rumped falcon as Neohierax insignis in tribe Falconini.

The white-rumped falcon is also known as white-rumped pygmy falcon, white-rumped falconet, Fielden's falconet, or Burmese pigmy falcon.

== Description ==
The plumage is white underneath and on the rump, with black ticking on the chest. The upper surface of the wings is dark grey. Sexually dimorphic, the female has a rufous (Note: Described as "deep chestnut" by Walden and "bright ferruginous red" by Swann.) mantle on her upper back and behind the head, whereas in the male these areas are grey. The tail is black, barred with white.

The shape of the tail is notably rounded, with the outermost feathers an inch shorter than the middle ones. Its wings have the pointed shape typical of falcons, with the second primary feathers longest, and the first nearly equal to the third. (Note: Note the similarity in Swann's descriptions for the primary flight feathers of Polihierax, p. 183, Neohierax, p. 184, and Falco, p. 186.)

Its legs and feet are yellow, hence the French name fauconnet à pattes jaunes (yellow-legged falconet). Base of the bill and skin surrounding the eye are yellow. Tip of the beak is grey or horn-coloured.

The wings are 145 mm (5 3/4 in) long, and the tail is 130 mm (5 in). Modern sources give the overall length as 23–28 cm (9–11 in), weight 84–112 g (3–4 oz), and wingspan 42–49 centimetres (16 1/2–19 1/4 in).

Its coloration is similar to the African pygmy falcon (Polihierax semitorquatus), but the white-rumped falcon is larger and proportionally longer-tailed.

== Distribution and habitat ==
Found in Cambodia, Laos, Myanmar, Thailand, and Vietnam, its natural habitats are subtropical or tropical dry forests and dry savanna. The IUCN considers it "near-threatened" by habitat loss due to logging and forest fires, and possibly hunting.

== Behaviour ==
=== Feeding ===
White-rumped falcons feed on lizards and insects, which are taken from the ground or in trees. Unlike Microhierax falconets, they do not hawk insects from the air.

=== Breeding ===
This species has been little studied in the wild. It uses holes in trees for nesting, the female incubates the eggs during the day. The female lays a clutch of two white eggs, approximately 35 mm (1.4 in) long.

A pair have been observed to nest in a woodpecker hole, both the male and female roosting there overnight.
