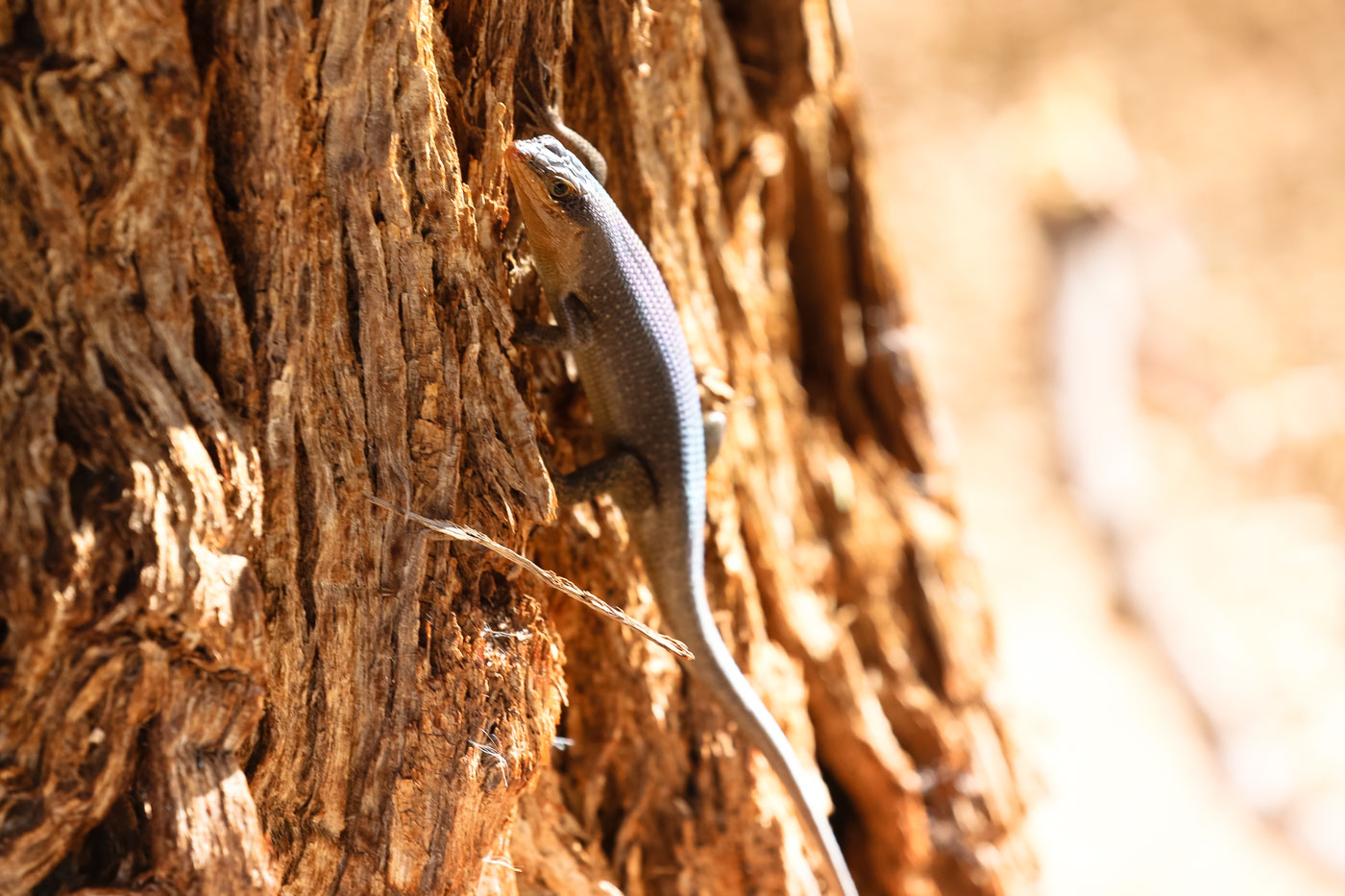

Scientific classification
- Domain: Eukaryota
- Kingdom: Animalia
- Phylum: Chordata
- Class: Reptilia
- Order: Squamata
- Family: Scincidae
- Genus: Trachylepis
- Species: T. spilogaster

Binomial name
- Trachylepis spilogaster (Peters, 1882)

Synonyms
- Mabuya spilogaster; Euprepis spilogaster

= Trachylepis spilogaster =

Kalahari tree skink

Species of lizard

The Kalahari tree skink (Trachylepis spilogaster), or spiny mabuya, is a species of lizard in the skink family (Scincidae). The species is endemic to southern Africa, including Namibia, South Africa, western Botswana, and southern Angola.

== Habitat ==
Kalahari tree skinks have been found to live around trees that contain the large colonial nests of the sociable weaver. Their numbers are higher in these areas despite a known predator of skinks, the pygmy falcon, also nesting in these trees. It is theorized that the increased opportunity for places of refuge outweigh the risk of predation. Skinks found on colony trees have learned to eavesdrop on sociable weavers to warn of approaching pygmy falcons.
