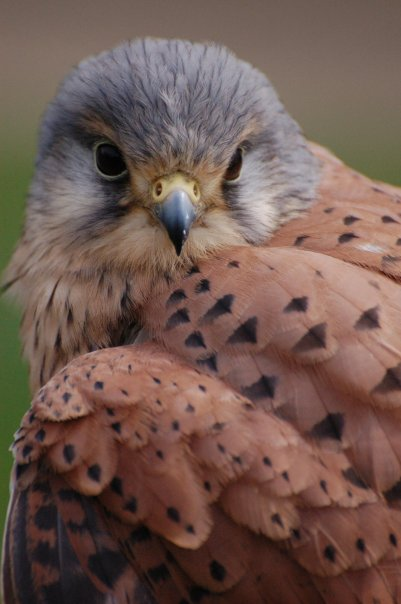
- Common kestrel (Falco tinnunculus)

Scientific classification
- Kingdom: Animalia
- Phylum: Chordata
- Class: Aves
- Order: Falconiformes
- Family: Falconidae
- Subfamily: Falconinae; Leach, 1820

Genera
- Spiziapteryx; Microhierax; Neohierax; Polihierax; Falco

= Falconinae =

Falconinae Temporal range: Oligocene – Holocene, 30.2–0 Ma

Subfamily of birds

Falconinae is a subfamily of falconid birds of prey that includes 44 species in five genera. It includes Microhierax (the typical falconets), Polihierax (the pygmy falcons), and Falco (the true falcons). Molecular data since 2015 has found support in the grouping of these genera, with Polihierax being paraphyletic in respect to Falco. Falconinae and their sister taxon, Polyborinae, split off from Herpetotherinae around 30.2 million years ago in the Oligocene Epoch. Falconines split off from the polyborines around 20 million years ago in the Miocene Epoch.
