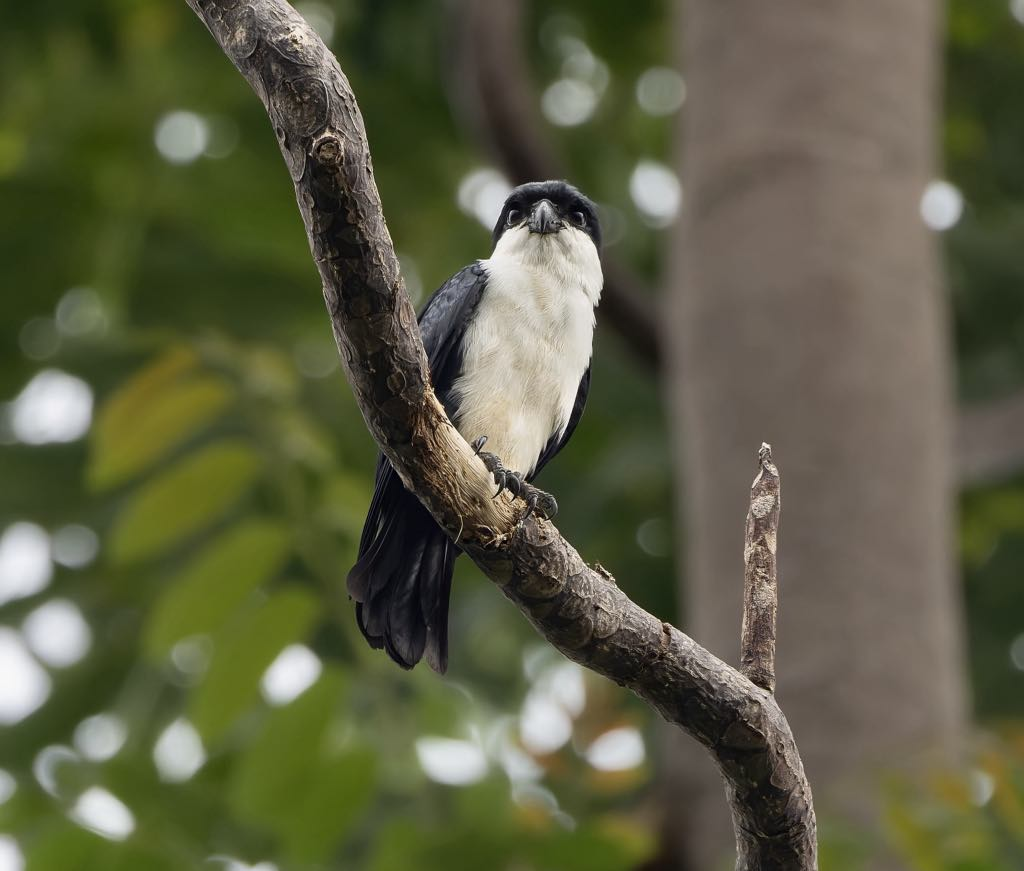

Conservation status
- Least Concern (IUCN 3.1)

Scientific classification
- Kingdom: Animalia
- Phylum: Chordata
- Class: Aves
- Order: Falconiformes
- Family: Falconidae
- Genus: Microhierax
- Species: M. erythrogenys

Binomial name
- Microhierax erythrogenys (Vigors, 1831)

= Philippine falconet =

Species of bird

The Philippine falconet (Microhierax erythrogenys) is a species of bird of prey in the family Falconidae, genus Microhierax. It is endemic to the lowland forests of Philippines, and can often be seen near open forest edges hunting flying insects. Philippine falconets nest in woodpecker holes of dead trees, and can be seen fairly commonly within their suitable habitats. Although the Philippine falconet population is declining due to habitat loss, it is still evaluated as "Least Concern" globally.

== Description ==
The Philippine falconet has a length of 15 – 18 cm, a wingspan of 32 – 37 cm, and a body mass of 37 – 52 g. Compared to other members in the Falconidae family, it is extremely small. Philippine falconet has a plumage coloration of black and white. It has uniformly black upperparts from head to tail, and white underparts from cheek to lower neck, with a washed buff belly. The underwing coverts are black, and the flight feathers are inconspicuously barred white.

Female has all-black underwings (unlike male, which has white spots on inner webs to the remiges) and is also up to 20% larger. The southern subspecies are slightly larger than the northern subspecies. Scientists also found that individuals on different islands have distinct differences in tail, bill, and wing, indicating exceptional degrees of endemism in this species.

== Taxonomy ==
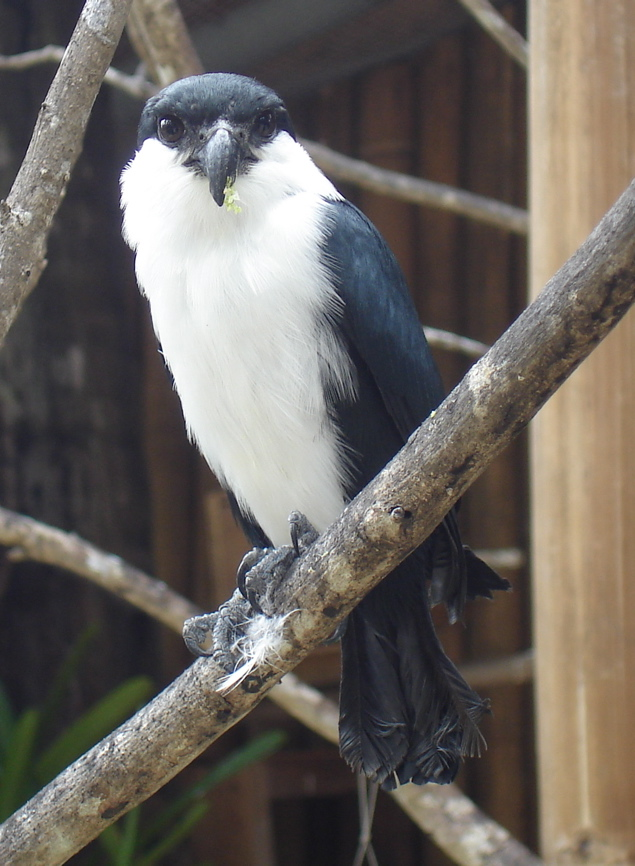
A captive Philippine Falconet

The Philippine falconet belongs to a small bird of prey genus in the family of Falconidae. Species of genus Microhierax are found in Southeast Asia and are usually smaller than other individuals from the Falconidae family. There are currently five extant species in this genus. Scientists found that all five species cluster separately from other falconet species, and form a sister group to the larger Falco assemblage.

The genus name Microhierax comes from ancient Greek, meaning "tiny hawk". Microhierax erythrogenys was grouped into this genus in 1874 by Sharpe Bowdler.

=== Subspecies ===
Two subspecies are recognised:

- M. e. erythrogenys – Found in Luzon, Mindoro, Negros, Catanduanes, and Bohol
- M. e. meridionalis – Found Calicoan, Samar, Leyte, and Cebu (likely extriprated) to Mindanao

The two subspecies are morphologically different from each other as a result of colonizing diverse island habitats with geographic barriers. The southern population is found to be generally larger in size and has distinct differences in tail, bill, and wing. One study looking at the morphological difference in Philippine falconet surprisingly found that those distinct differences in tail, bill, and wing also exist within subspecies. Coupled with genetic analysis, scientists still failed to explain this stepped cline in the morphology of the Philippine falconet. More studies are encouraged to look for similar trends in other Philippine birds.

== Habitat and Distribution ==
The Philippine falconet is endemic to the Philippine archipelago. It is distributed across several Philippine islands (Luzon, Mindoro, Negros, Catanduanes, Bohol, Calicoan, Samar, Leyte, Cebu, Mindanao and Panay) and can be found in subtropical or tropical moist lowland forests. Philippine falconet usually occurs in pairs, or in family groups, and is usually singing. When foraging, this species perches on prominent branches or canopy of old dead trees where it hawks for prey.

== Behaviors ==
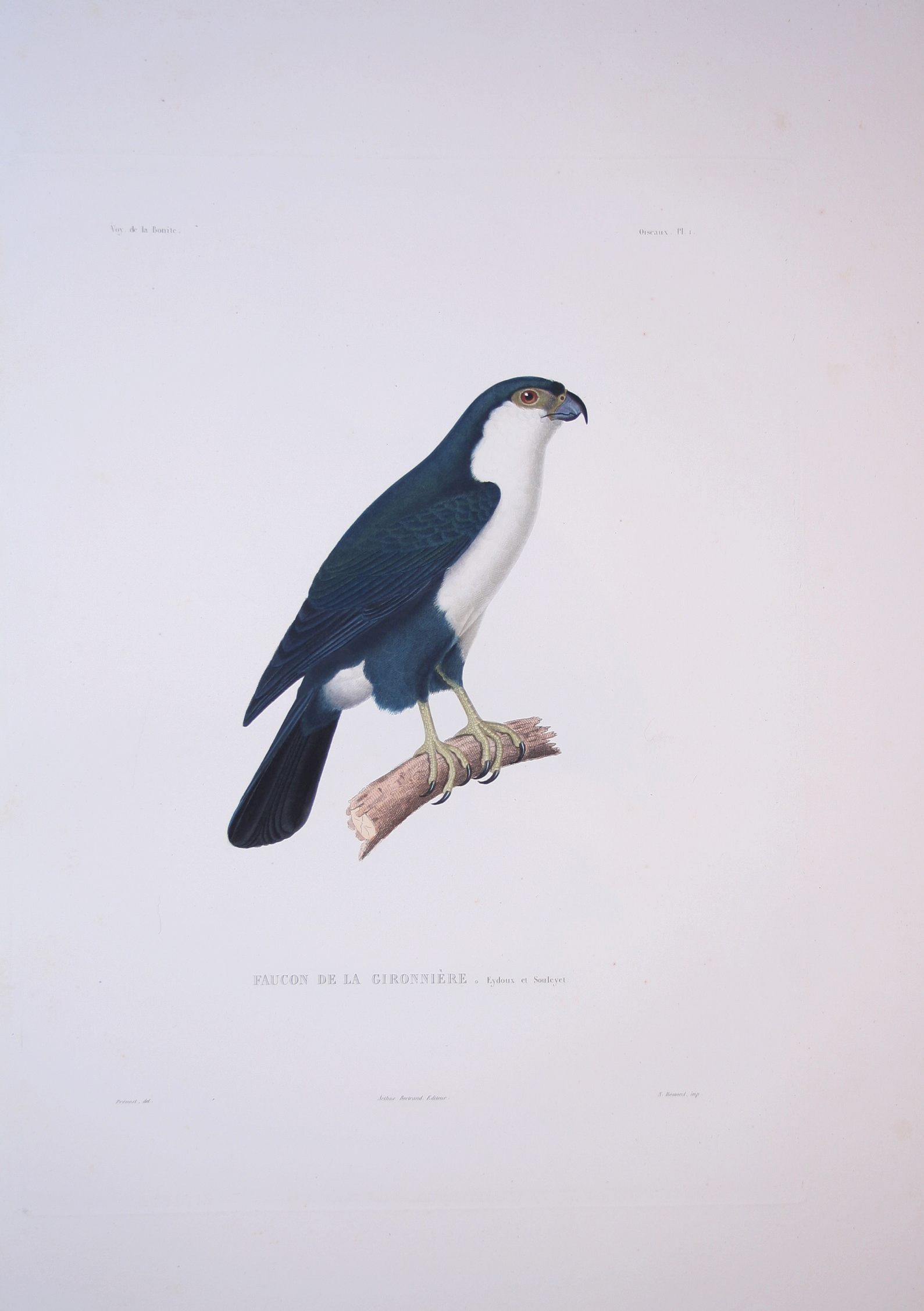
An illustration

=== Vocalization ===
The Philippine falconet gives a rapid, high-pitched "kek-kek-kek-kek" and a continuous, squeaky "pew-pew-pew-pew" with about two notes per second.

=== Diet ===
Like other falconets, Philippine falconets do not hover or soar. They hunt aerial prey from exposed tree perches and chase them down with fast and powerful flights. Once the prey is snatched in the bird's bill, it is carried back to the same perch where it gets eaten. The species feeds mainly on insects and smaller birds. The proportions of insects and birds in the diet may vary according to availability. One study suggests that dragonfly makes up nearly 70% of their diet, alongside other insects such as bees, butterflies, grasshoppers, and beetles.

Juvenile Philippine falconets learn how to hunt by watching and participating in communal hunting with experienced adults. It is often seen up to six adult and juvenile Philippine falconets feeding on a single prey item that was caught previously.

=== Reproduction ===
Breeding takes place in March and April. However, sometimes nests can be found as early as November. It is still unclear when precisely breeding takes place, but scientists generally believe that it differs in different island environments.

Philippine falconets are cavity nesters. They prefer old woodpecker or barbet holes at 6 to 10 meters above the ground in dead trees at the edge of forests. The clutch size is typically 3 – 4 eggs. The nest is strongly defended by both adults. The family usually stays together until the next breeding season.

== Conservation status ==
The International Union for Conservation of Nature has assessed this bird as a Least-concern species as it has a large range and is still locally common in some areas. However, despite not being a threatened species, the population is believed to be on the decline and is just estimated at 670 to 6,700 mature individuals. This species' main threat is habitat loss with wholesale clearance of forest habitats as a result of logging, agricultural conversion and mining activities occurring within the range.
