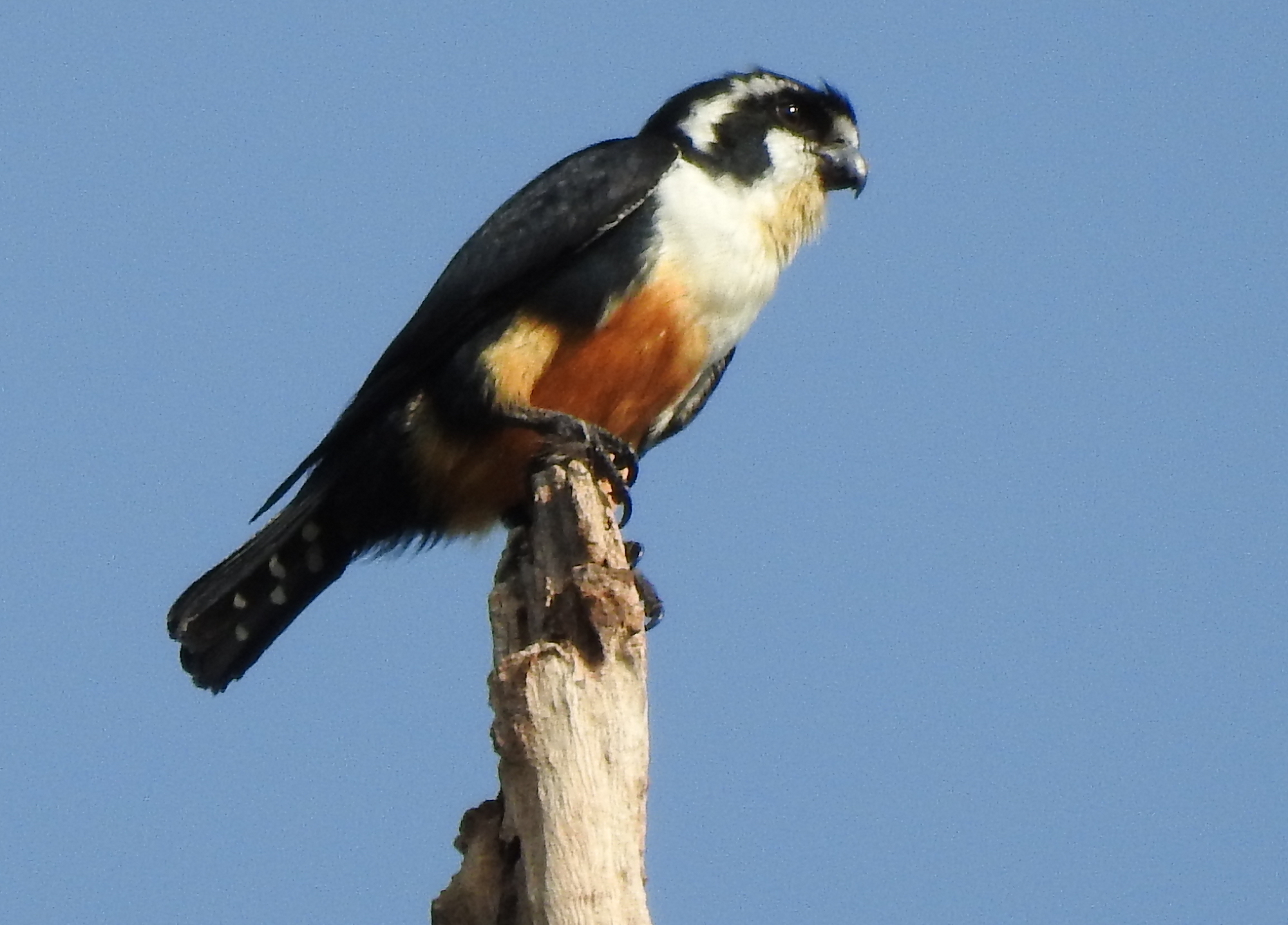

Conservation status
- Least Concern (IUCN 3.1)

Scientific classification
- Kingdom: Animalia
- Phylum: Chordata
- Class: Aves
- Order: Falconiformes
- Family: Falconidae
- Genus: Microhierax
- Species: M. fringillarius

Binomial name
- Microhierax fringillarius (Drapiez, 1824)

= Black-thighed falconet =

Species of bird

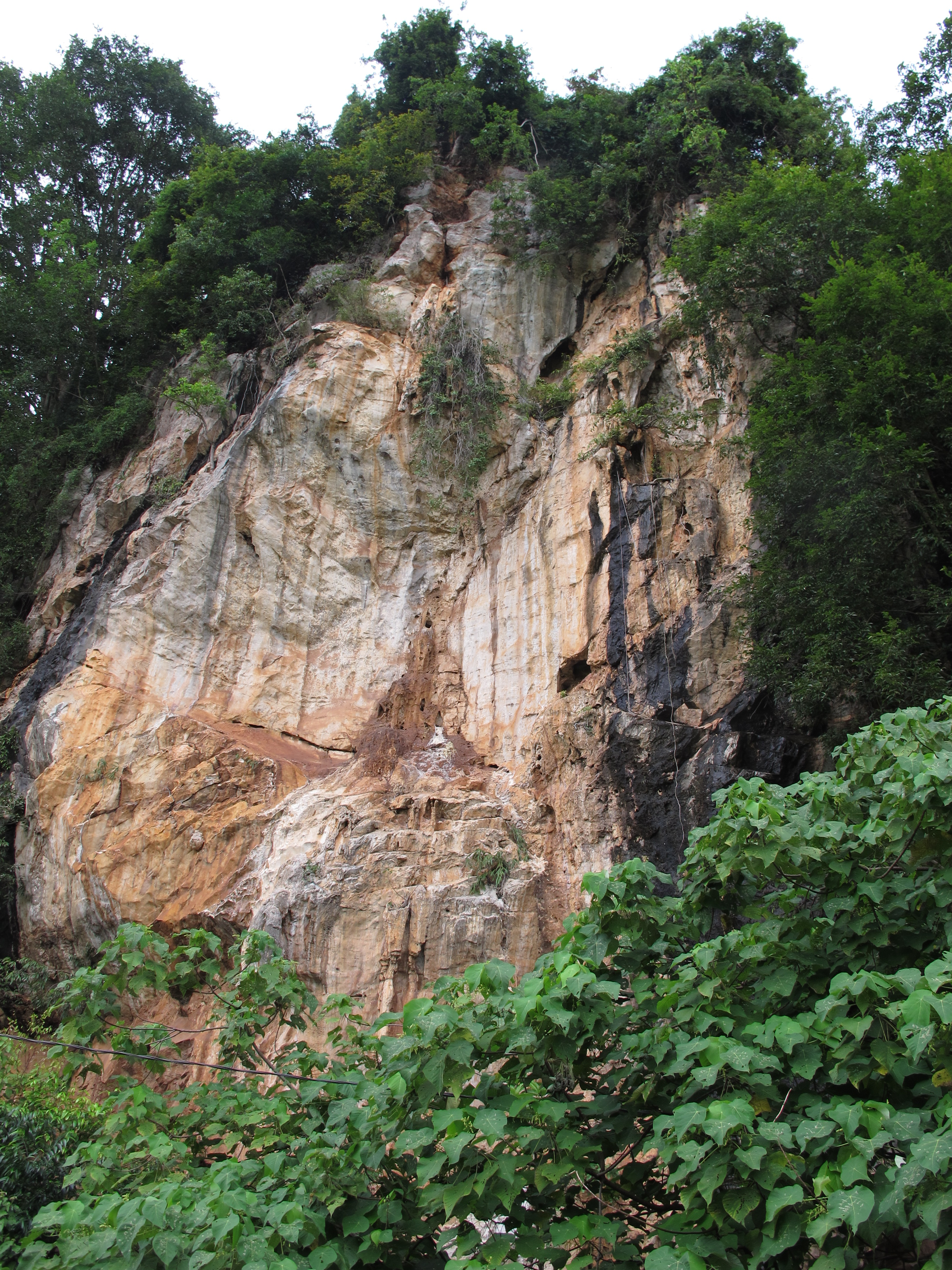
A black-thighed falconet breeding site in Ipoh, Peninsular Malaysia

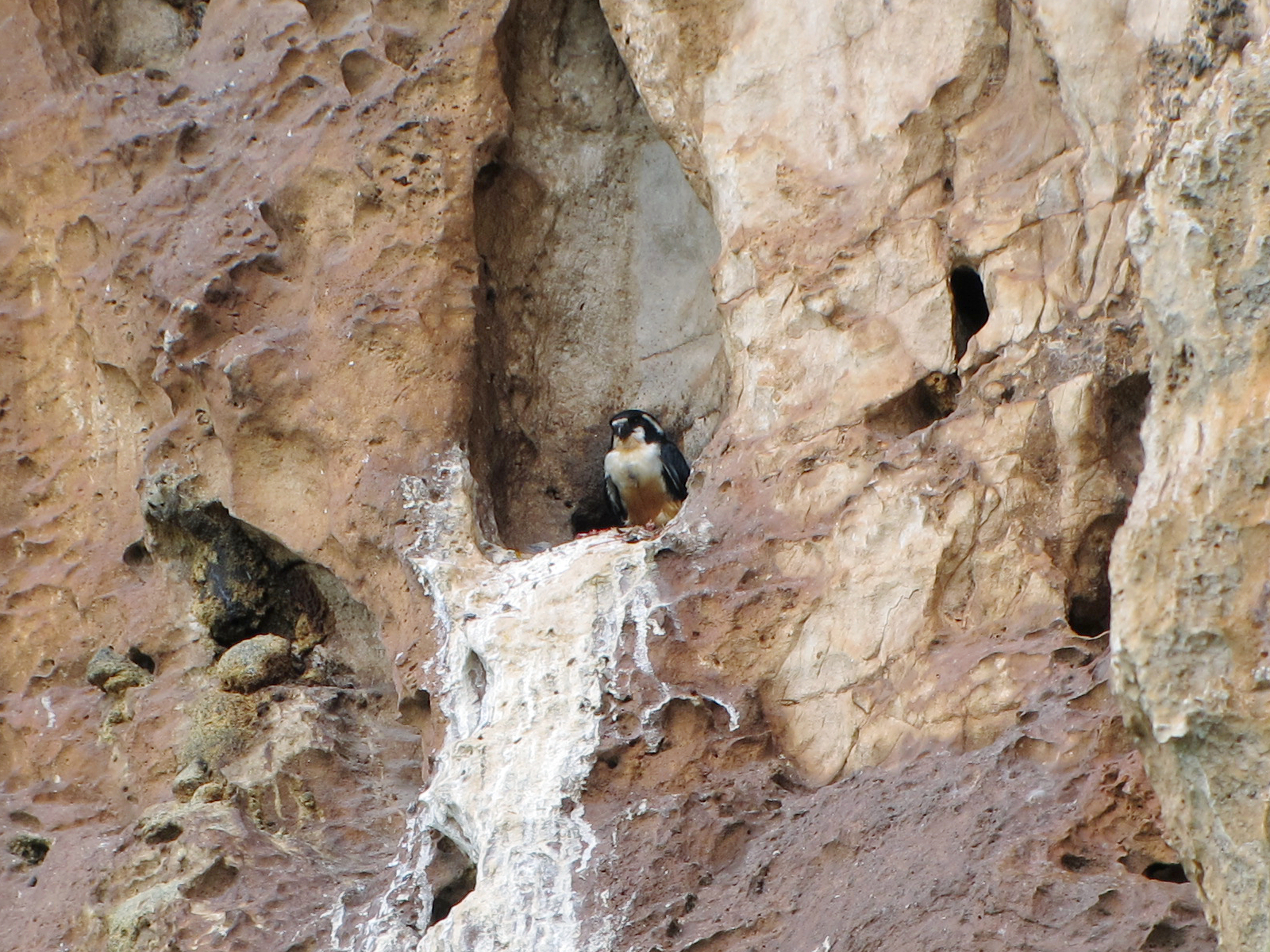
Black-thighed falconet in the breeding site shown above

The black-thighed falconet (Microhierax fringillarius) is one of the smallest birds of prey, typically measuring between 14–16 centimetres (5.5–6.3 in) long, with a 27–32 centimetres (11–13 in) wingspan, which is a size comparable to a typical sparrow. It is native to Brunei, Myanmar, Thailand, Malaysia, Singapore and Indonesia, and vagrant to Sri Lanka.

== Taxonomy and systematics ==
Thomas Horsfield described to the Linnean Society of London in 1820 a Javan variety of Falco cærulescens (the collared falconet). He noted that "the Javan specimens are somewhat smaller, and differently marked" than the Bengal specimen which had been described by John Edwards in 1750. A fuller description was published in his 1824 book, Zoological Researches in Java.

Also in 1824, Auguste Drapiez published the name Falco fringillarius, and Nicholas Vigors proposed the genus Ierax or Hierax.

== Description ==
This is a minute, shrike-like falcon, with a squarish tail that is frequently spread. The adult male is glossy black above, with a white forehead streak that arcs around black cheeks. It has a white or rufous-washed throat, with a white breast shading into a rufous abdomen. Its thighs and flanks are black, as is its cere and legs. In flight the male has white wings underneath with black barring on the primaries and secondary flight feathers, and light streaking on the underwing coverts. There are three white bars underneath on the otherwise plain black tail. The adult female is similar to the adult male, except the tail is longer. The juvenile is similar to the adults, except that the white areas of the head are rufous. The voice is a hard, high-pitched cry shiew and a fast repeated kli-kli-kli-kli.

== Habitat ==
The typical habitat is forest, forest edge and wooded open area. It can also frequently be found around human cultivation, villages, and near active slash-and-burn forest clearance; often by rivers, streams, and paddy fields. It mostly lives below 1,500m elevation.

== Food ==
This falconet mainly feeds on insects, including moths, butterflies, dragonflies, alate termites and cicadas, occasional small birds, and lizards. Feeding behaviour appears to often be social, with feeding parties up to ten recorded. Much of the prey is taken during quick flights from a perch.

== Sociosexual behaviour and breeding ==
This falconet is generally social and gregarious, often found in loose pairs or groups of ten or more. The breeding season for this falcon varies by location, with populations up to the North of the equator breeding mostly in February–June. To the South of the equator, egg-laying is recorded in Java in November–December. This falconet usually uses old nest holes of barbets, or occasionally old woodpecker holes. No material is added in the cavity aside from insect remains. The typical clutch size is between 2-5 eggs. Incubation and fledging periods are unknown. The nest hole may be used as a roost by adults year-round.

== Population ==
There is no data on population densities, but like many tiny falconets, the total numbers are probably under-recorded. The overall range extends more than 1.5 million km^{2}. Population assessments vary from common (in Sumatra and Borneo), to fairly common (in Thailand), to scarce (in Java and Bali). In any case, the population seems to be in the upper tens of thousands, and appears to be tolerant of habitat disturbance.

== See also ==
- Smallest organisms
