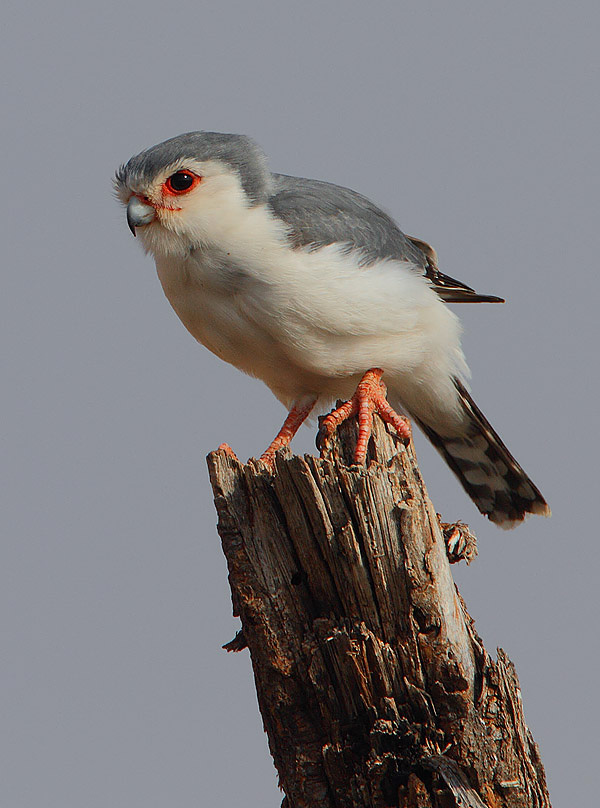
- Male in Buffalo Springs National Reserve, Kenya
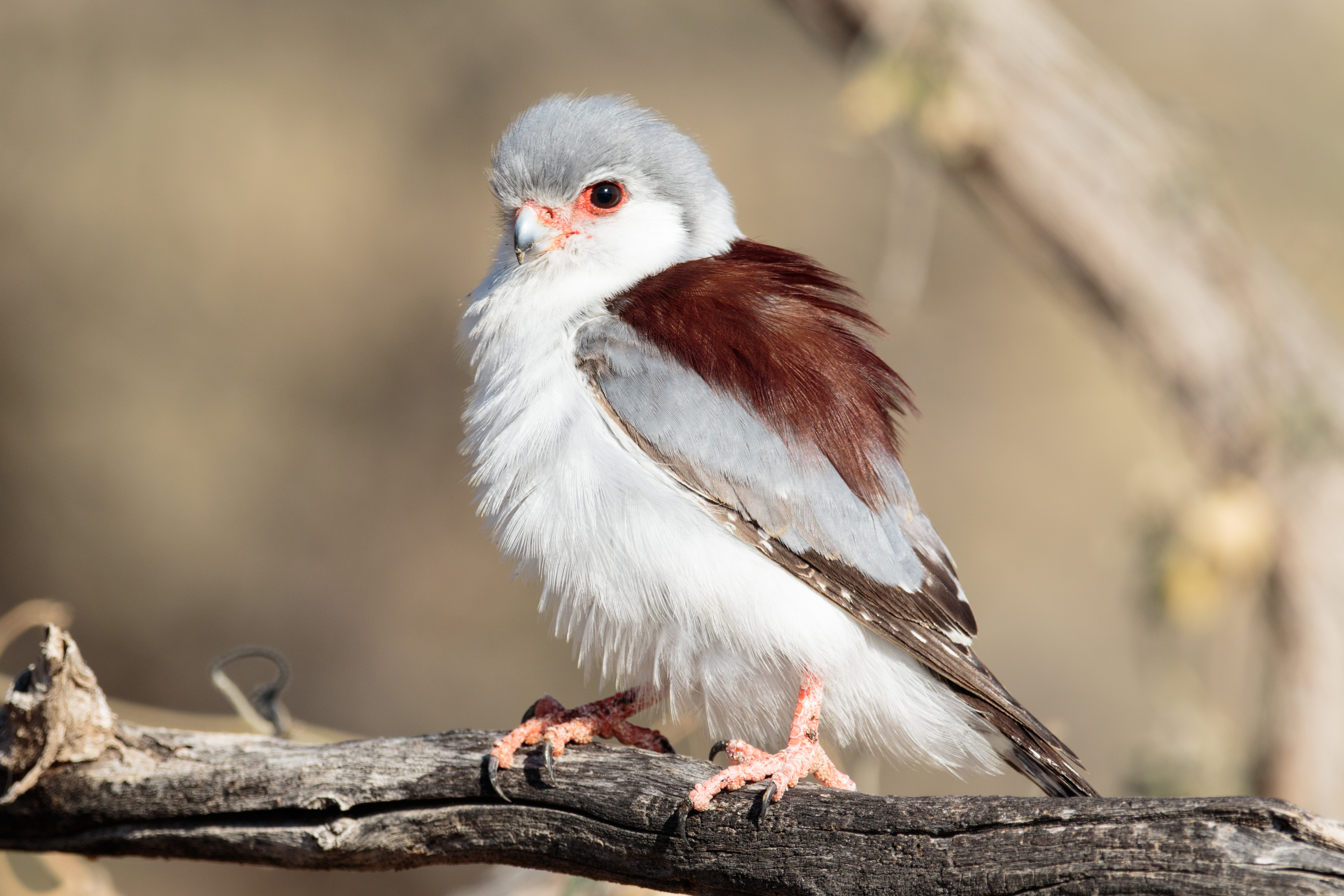
- Female in Kgalagadi Transfrontier Park, Botswana/South Africa

Conservation status
- Least Concern (IUCN 3.1)

Scientific classification
- Kingdom: Animalia
- Phylum: Chordata
- Class: Aves
- Order: Falconiformes
- Family: Falconidae
- Subfamily: Falconinae
- Genus: Polihierax; Kaup, 1847
- Species: P. semitorquatus

Binomial name
- Polihierax semitorquatus (Smith, A, 1836)

= Pygmy falcon =

Species of bird

The African pygmy falcon (Polihierax semitorquatus)—or simply pygmy falcon—is a diminutive raptor native to eastern and southern Africa. It is the sole species in its monotypic genus, Polihierax. The pygmy falcon is the smallest bird of prey on the African continent, and among the smallest raptors on earth; only the Asian falconets (of the genus Microhierax) are smaller, weighing roughly 30-40 grams less and measuring about 5 cm shorter from head to tail.

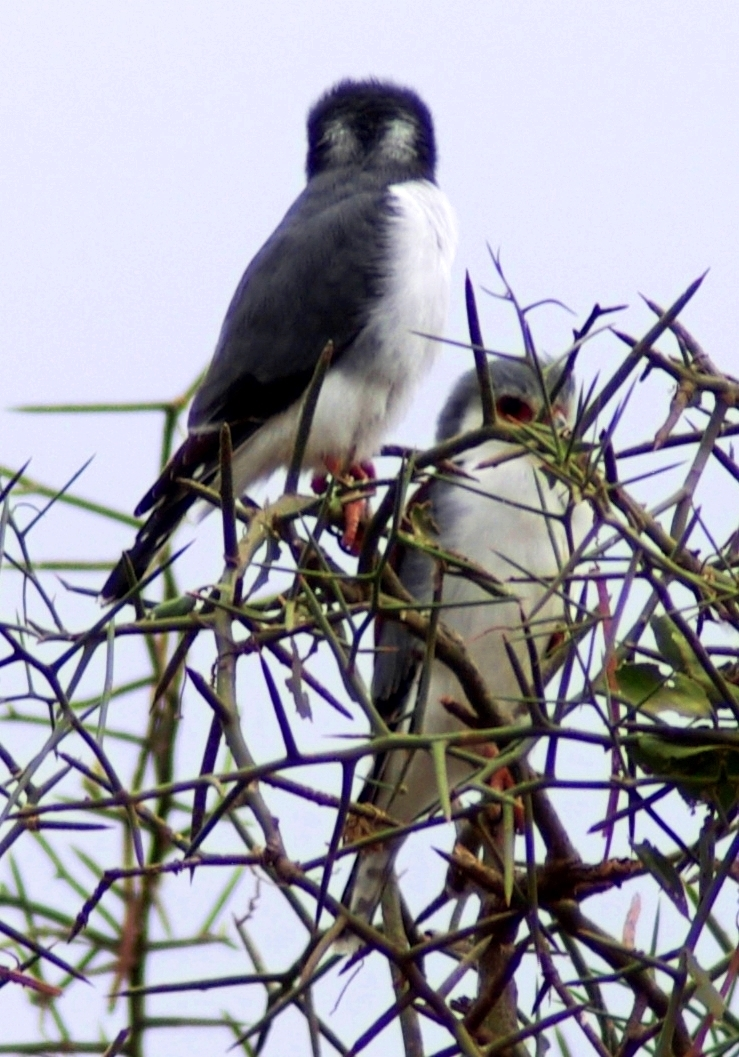
The male bird to the upper left has its face turned away, showing its white false "eye spots".

== Description ==
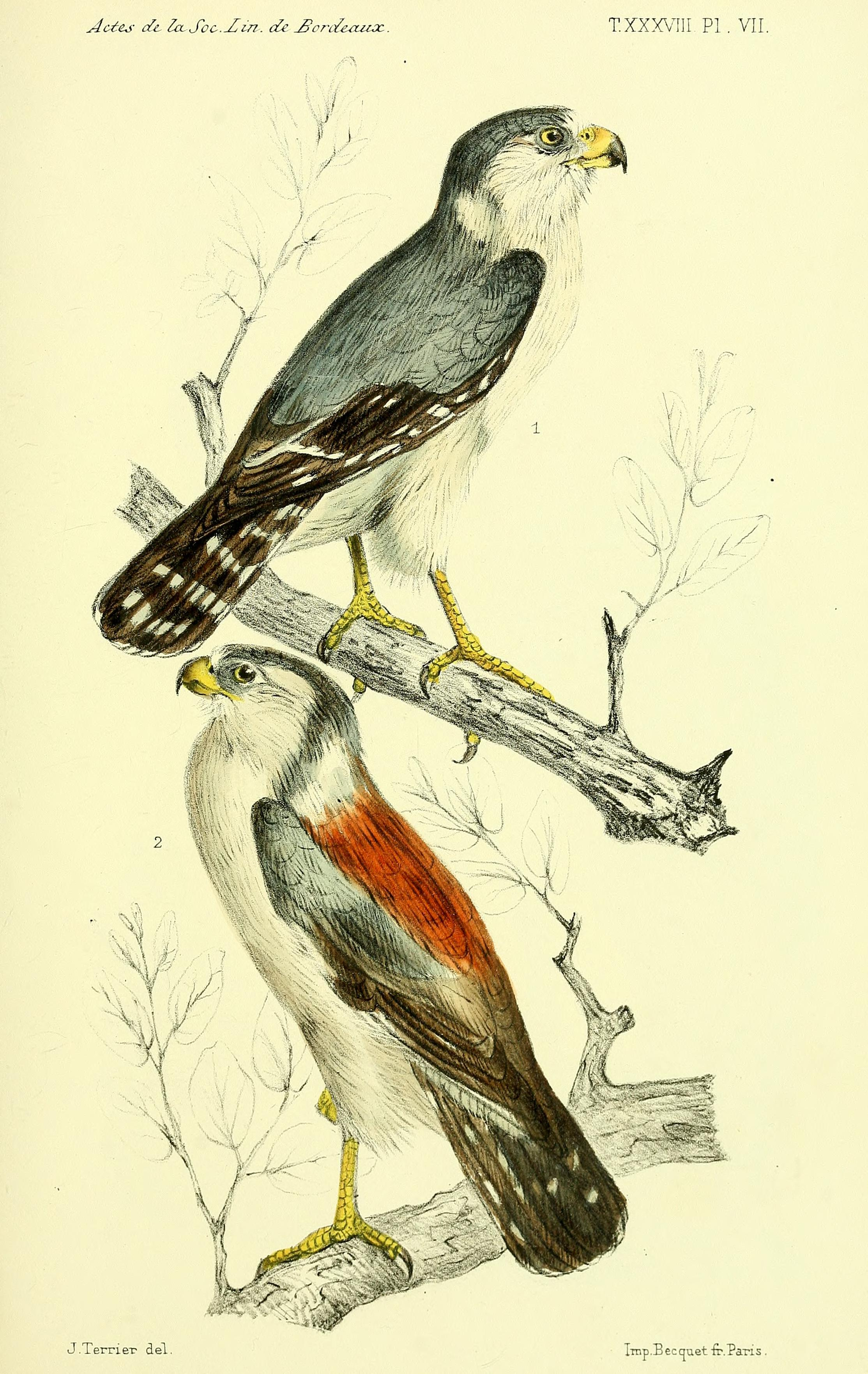
Illustration of male and female.

Adult pygmy falcons are 20 cm (7.9 in) in length and 54 to 76 g (1.9–2.7 oz) in weight. These birds are white-bellied, extending up to the face, with males having grey on their backsides, and females having a chestnut back. There are white "eye spots" on the nape. Juveniles have a brown back, duller than adult females, with a rufous wash on the breast. The flight feathers of the wings are spotted black and white (more black above, more white below); the tail is barred black and white.

Their flight style is low and undulating. With regards to the pygmy falcon's similarly small size and similar feather colors, they superficially resemble some species of shrikes.

The call is "a high-pitched kikiKIK, repeated" (Kenya) or "a 'chip-chip' and a 'kik-kik-kik-kik'" (southern Africa).

== Distribution and habitat ==
The pygmy falcon inhabits dry bush. The subspecies P. s. castanonotus occurs from South Sudan to Somalia and south to Uganda and Tanzania; P. s. semitorquatus occurs from Angola to northern South Africa. This range is estimated to have an area of 7.86 million km^{2} (3.03 million mi^{2}), and the total pygmy falcon population is estimated to be, at its lowest, 100,000 birds, possibly numbering up to one million at its peak.

== Behaviour and ecology ==
Pygmy falcons show physiological traits that have adaptive value in a region affected by environmental variability associated with the El Niño–Southern Oscillation cycle, as well as varying food sources. They regulate their body temperature by thermal buffering provided by sociable weaver colonies and communal roosting by the falcons. This is important because it reduces the energy requirements for rest-phase thermoregulation by occupants.

=== Food and feeding ===
Pygmy falcons prey on reptiles and insects, but will occasionally prey on small birds, as well as rodents and appropriately-sized or juvenile small mammals. They hunt from a high perch, swooping down and pouncing on their targeted prey. However, some potential prey animals attempt to outsmart the cunning falcons; Kalahari tree skinks have apparently been observed 'eavesdropping' on nearby sociable weaver birds, who will loudly warn of any approaching danger, enabling the skinks to run for cover.

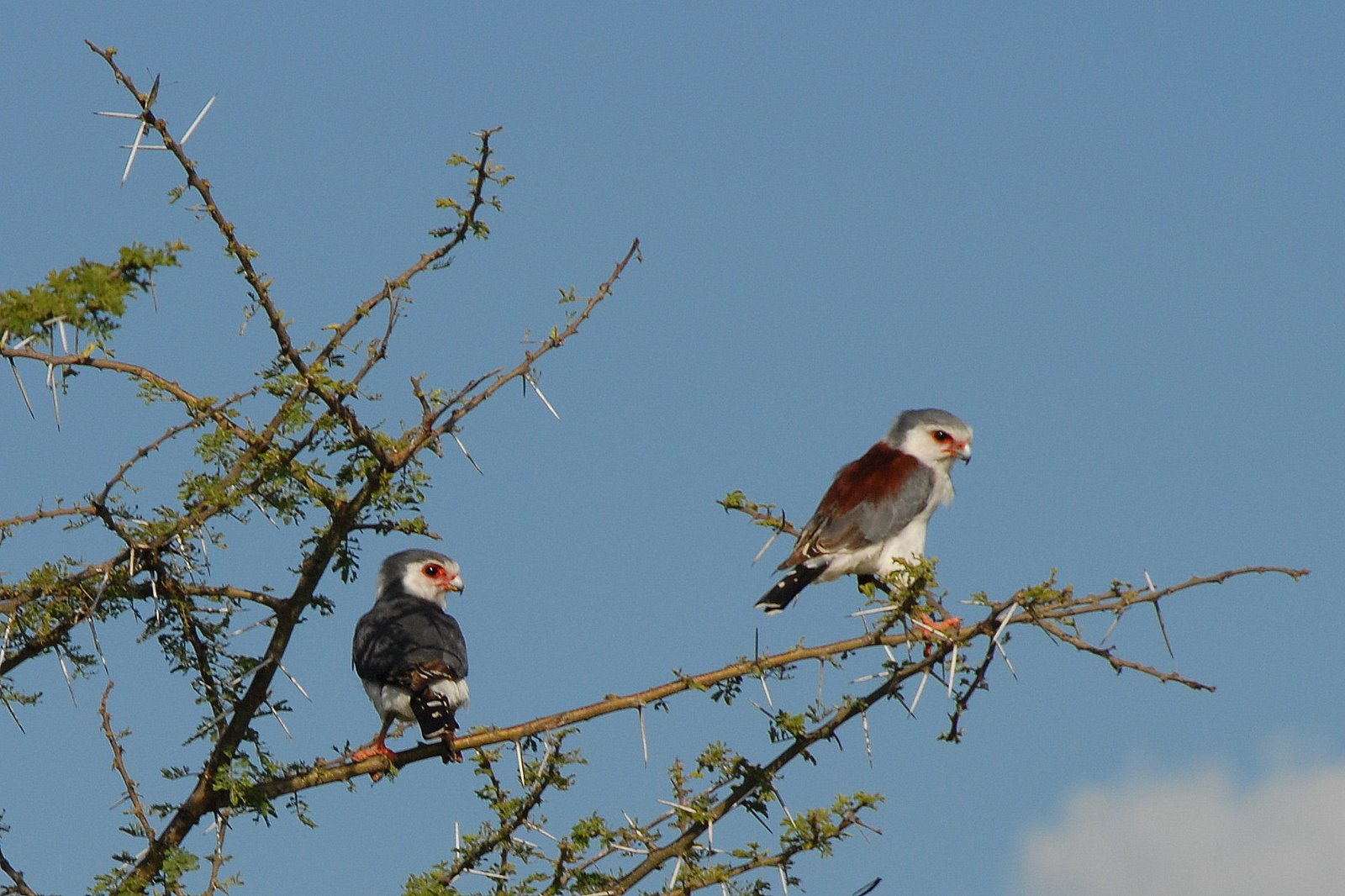
A pair at Serengeti National Park, Tanzania. Male on left and female (brown back) on the right.

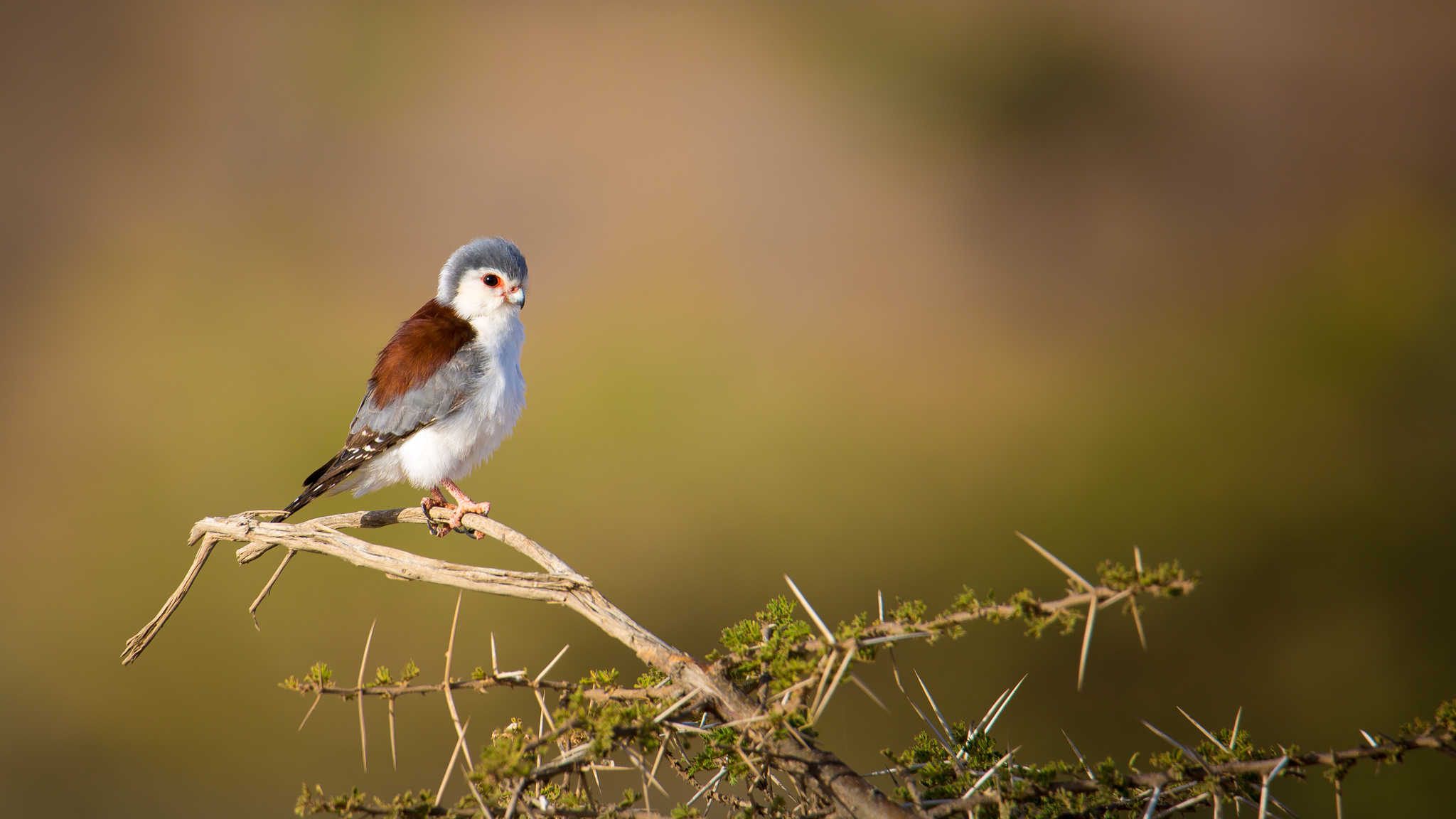
Pygmy falcon, female, at Buffalo Springs National Reserve, Kenya.

=== Breeding ===
In Kenya, pygmy falcons nest in white-headed buffalo weaver nests, and the ranges of the two birds coincide. In southern Africa, they are found around red-billed buffalo weaver nests but predominantly nest in the vacant rooms of sociable weaver nests, which are large and multichambered—even if the sociable weavers still have an active colony in the nest. Despite being bird-eaters and bigger than sociable weavers, the pygmy falcons largely leave the latter alone, though they do occasionally catch and eat nestlings and even adults.

In addition, falcons are obligate users of white-headed buffalo weaver nests; therefore, they experience all of the benefits these nests provide without the energetic cost of building or maintaining them. Weavers also do not maintain these nest chambers occupied by falcons, increasing the likelihood that these particular chambers will break off the main colony. However, falcons appear to have a preference for chambers away from the center of the colony and with shorter entrance tunnels. Although it is likely that falcons would benefit from selecting chambers with better insulation, they are larger than weavers and, as a result, may struggle to access chambers through longer entrance tunnels.

Pygmy falcons mark their nests by the use of their faecal matter, but the reasons behind this are unknown. It has been suggested that this conspicuous faecal mat (white when fresh and turning pinkish with age) present at the entrance of the chamber could deter snakes and reduce the number of ectoparasites. Faecal matter is also thought to boost the immune system of chicks as well as signal to conspecifics. Faecal mats at the entrance of occupied chambers may serve as a social signal to indicate to other falcons that a colony is occupied.

On one occasion, a male pygmy falcon was recorded killing another male, and then subsequently took over the dead male's territory and reproduced with the dead male's partner.

Breeding occurs between August and February, with a peak in September and December. The maximum and most frequent clutch size was three eggs; these falcons usually only breed once or up to three times per season.

==== Cooperative breeding ====
Pygmy falcon territories are occasionally inhabited by groups, where there are more than two adults living together and tending nestlings. There are four potential reasons for this behaviour: defence, co-operative polyandry, delayed dispersal of offspring, cooperation, and thermoregulation (warmth). Corroboration for the last is that in winter, African pygmy falcons nest further inside the nest of sociable weavers, where there is better insulation.

== Status ==
Pygmy falcons are not threatened.
