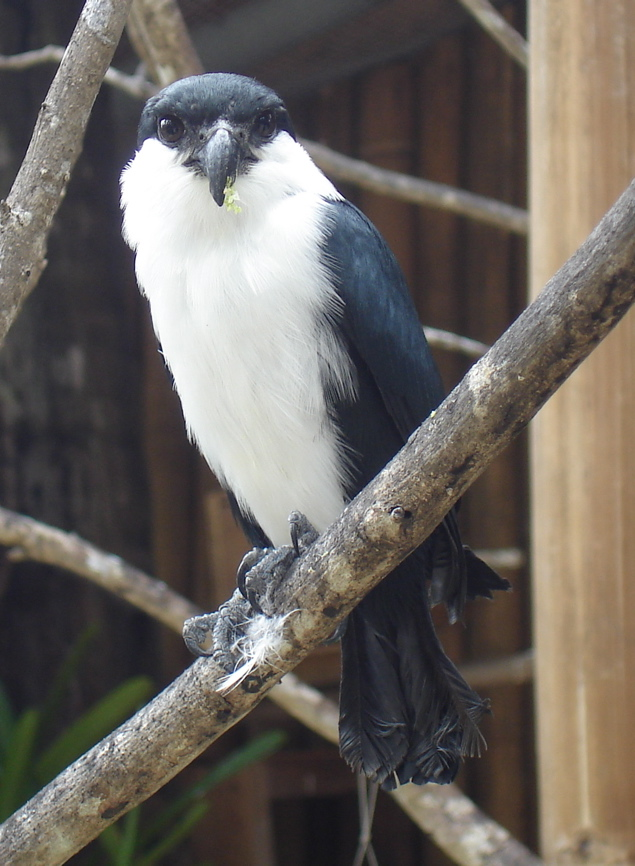
- Philippine falconet (Microhierax erythrogenys)

Scientific classification
- Kingdom: Animalia
- Phylum: Chordata
- Class: Aves
- Order: Falconiformes
- Family: Falconidae
- Subfamily: Falconinae
- Genus: Microhierax; Sharpe, 1874

Type species
- Falco fringillarius Drapiez, 1824

Species
- M. caerulescens; M. fringillarius; M. latifrons; M. erythrogenys; M. melanoleucos

= Microhierax =

Genus of birds

The typical falconets, Microhierax, are a bird of prey genus in the family Falconidae. They are found in southeast Asia and the smallest members of Falconiformes, averaging about 15 cm (5.9 in) in length and 35 g (1.2 oz) in weight. The smallest members of the genus are the relatively widespread black-thighed falconet, and the white-fronted falconet on the island of Borneo.

== Taxonomy and systematics ==
The first description by a European ornithologist of a falconet from this group was published by George Edwards in 1750, as "the little black and orange colour'd Indian hawk". It was from a specimen that had been collected in Bengal and sent to the King's physician, Dr Mead. In 1758 Carl Linnaeus used the illustration and description by Edwards to formally describe the species under the binomial name Falco cærulescens In 1760 the French naturalist Mathurin Jacques Brisson also used Edwards' publication to describe le Faucon de Bengale. Although the white collar was not mentioned, the English ornithologist Richard Bowdler Sharpe believed that this was the same species that is now called the collared falconet.

In 1824, Vigors proposed a new genus Ierax, writing "whoever has seen that beautiful species, the smallest of its race, F. cærulescens, Linn., now rendered familiar to us by the accurate and splendid illustrations of Dr. Horsfield, will at once acknowledge its separation from every other established genus of its family." Later authors rendered the name Hierax.

Sharpe coined the name Microhierax in 1874, from the Greek μικρός ἱεραξ meaning "tiny hawk". By this time, four species were known: M. cærulescens, M. fringillarius, M. melanoleucos, and M. erythrogenys. He lists Horsfield's specimen "Falco cærulescens" as being actually M. fringillarius, making the latter the type of the genus.

A fifth species, the white-fronted falconet M. latifrons, was described by Sharpe in 1879.

== Extant Species ==
Image	Scientific name	Common name	Distribution
	Microhierax caerulescens	Collared falconet Red legged falconet	Bangladesh, Bhutan, Cambodia, India, Laos, Myanmar, Nepal, Thailand, Malaysia, and Vietnam.
	Microhierax fringillarius	Black-thighed falconet	Brunei, Myanmar, Thailand, Malaysia, Singapore and Indonesia. and vagrant to Sri Lanka
	Microhierax latifrons	White-fronted falconet	Sabah on the island of Borneo
	Microhierax erythrogenys	Philippine falconet	Philippines
	Microhierax melanoleucos	Pied falconet	Bangladesh, Bhutan, China, Hong Kong, India, Laos, and Vietnam.
