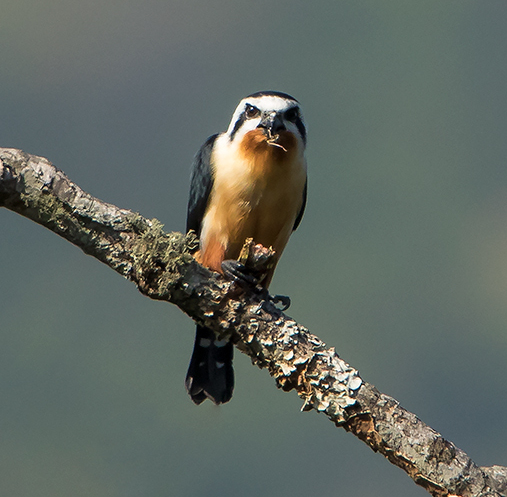

Conservation status
- Least Concern (IUCN 3.1)

Scientific classification
- Kingdom: Animalia
- Phylum: Chordata
- Class: Aves
- Order: Falconiformes
- Family: Falconidae
- Genus: Microhierax
- Species: M. caerulescens

Binomial name
- Microhierax caerulescens (Linnaeus, 1758)

Synonyms
- Falco caerulescens Linnaeus, 1758

= Collared falconet =

Species of bird

The collared falconet (Microhierax caerulescens) is a species of bird of prey in the family Falconidae.

It is found in the Indian subcontinent and Southeast Asia, ranging across Bangladesh, Bhutan, Cambodia, India, Laos, Myanmar, Nepal, Thailand, Malaysia, and Vietnam. Its natural habitat is temperate forest, often on the edges of broadleaf forest.

It is 18 cm (7.1 in) long. Rapid wingbeats are interspersed with long glides. When perched, it is described as being "rather shrikelike".

== Taxonomy and systematics ==
The first description by a European ornithologist was published by George Edwards in 1750, as "the little black and orange colour'd Indian hawk". It was from a specimen that had been collected in Bengal and sent to the king's physician, Richard Mead. In 1758 the Swedish naturalist Carl Linnaeus used the illustration and description by Edwards to formally describe the species under the binomial name Falco cærulescens. In 1760 the French naturalist Mathurin Jacques Brisson also used Edwards' publication to describe le Faucon de Bengale. Although the white collar was not mentioned, the English ornithologist Richard Bowdler Sharpe believed that this was the collared falconet. Richard Bowdler Sharpe introduced the genus Microhierax in 1874, from the Greek μικρόσ ἱεραξ meaning "tiny hawk".

== Description ==
The collared falconet is a very small falcon, shrike-like in shape, mainly pied and having bold white supercilia and collar, with relatively heavy double-toothed bill. It has shortish wings, a medium-length tail, strong half-feathered legs, and powerful feet. It perches conspicuously on top or edge of tree or bush, often on dead twig, frequently bobbing head and slowly moving tail up and down; wing-tips less than half down tail. Sexes are similar.

== Distribution ==
Mainland southeast Asia: Himalayan foothills of north India (northern Uttar Pradesh northwest to Kumaun, and Sikkim, Bengal, mainly northern Assam) and of Nepal and Bhutan, and from Burma (central and east, south to Tenasserim), Thailand (northwest and west, but not peninsular, also in strip east of central plains), Laos (central and south), Cambodia (especially north), and Vietnam.

== Habitat ==
Open deciduous forest, clearings and edges in evergreen forest, abandoned hill cultivation with some trees; often near water. Mostly 200–800 m (660–2,620 ft), fairly regularly to 1,700 m (5,600 ft).
