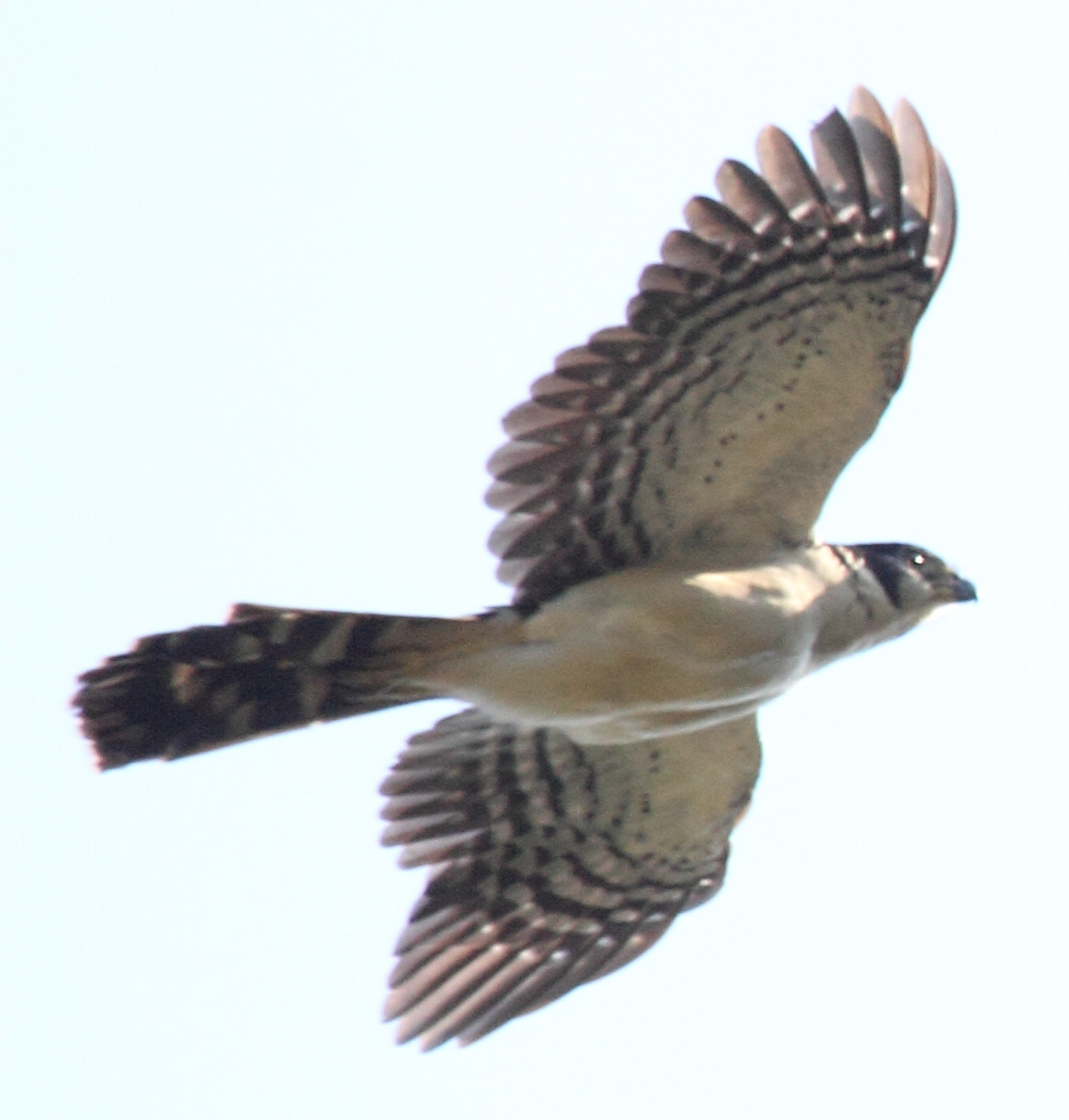

Conservation status
- Least Concern (IUCN 3.1)

Scientific classification
- Kingdom: Animalia
- Phylum: Chordata
- Class: Aves
- Order: Falconiformes
- Family: Falconidae
- Genus: Micrastur
- Species: M. semitorquatus

Binomial name
- Micrastur semitorquatus (Vieillot, 1817)

Subspecies
- M. semitorquatus semitorquatus; M. semitorquatus naso

= Collared forest falcon =

Species of bird

M. semitorquatus predation on a nest of Turdus albicollis

The collared forest falcon (Micrastur semitorquatus) is a species of bird of prey in the family Falconidae. It is the largest member of the Micrastur genus and a common inhabitant of tropical rainforests in Latin America. Hiding in the dense forest canopy, they are a secretive bird often only recognized by their distinctive call. With a morphology or body type allowing them to be agile in their forested habitat, their diet comprises a wide variety of prey from smaller frogs (20 g) to adult turkeys (2.7-3.2 kg).

Nesting occurs mainly in the cavities of Spanish cedar trees, which are also a key species exploited by the local logging industry. This is a potential conservation concern for the collared forest falcon.

== Description ==
The collared forest falcon has a dark coloured back with a white neck and breast. The species has three morphological variants (morphs): pale, tawny and dark. The former two have a light coloured collar at the back of their neck, which explains their name. This is the largest species of the forest falcon genus, with a total length of 46 to 58 cm (18 to 23 in), wingspan of 72 to 86 cm (28 to 34 in) and male weights of 467 to 646 g (1.030 to 1.424 lb), averaging some 523 g (1.153 lb), and female weights of 649–940 g (1.431–2.072 lb), averaging 740 g (1.63 lb), this species is nearly the size of peregrine falcon albeit longer-tailed and much shorter-winged. Although its forest lifestyle, rounded short wings, long tail and lack of the characteristic beak tooth suggest affinities to hawks, there are several morphological connections to the Falconidae in which it is now placed, e.g. moult pattern and the morphology of the skull.

M. semitorquatus display sexual size dimorphism, with the female being much larger than the males on many accounts such as mass, size of beak, tail and wing chord. It averages a value of 9.5 on the dimorphism index (moderately large). This value was calculated from observations done at Tikal National Park in Guatemala.

Nestlings are born with a cover of natal down, white nails, light yellow legs and short, deep, laterally compressed, yellowish white beaks. Their heads are held up and eyes open after a couple days. Pupils begin with a blue back hue and black iris which turns to a more chocolate brown after four weeks. After a few weeks the young are able to defend themselves if bothered. Down feathers will be gone by the sixth week, replaced with juvenile feathers. However, fledging will occur before wing and tail feathers are completely grown. In the weeks that follow, fledglings will continue to move further from the nesting site as they grow bigger and more confident.

== Taxonomy ==
The collared forest falcon is a member of the order Falconiformes in the family Falconidae. The largest member of the genus Micrastur, it has two recognized subspecies: M. s. naso and M. s. semitorquatus. The former occurs in regions starting from Mexico south descending through Central America towards the west Andes in Colombia, Ecuador and extreme northwest Peru. Alternatively, the latter is found mostly on the east side of the Andes.

Other members of the Micrastur genus include:

- Barred forest falcon, Micrastur ruficollis
- Plumbeous forest falcon, Micrastur plumbeus
- Lined forest falcon, Micrastur gilvicollis
- Cryptic forest falcon, Micrastur mintoni
- Slaty-backed forest falcon, Micrastur mirandollei
- Buckley's forest falcon, Micrastur buckleyi

M. semitorquatus at first was thought to include the species M. buckleyi, however this conclusion was disregarded after the description of a female and immature Buckley's forest falcon was done by Amadon (1964). The latter termed them different species and this view has been kept since then.

Morphological traits adapted to flying in a dense forest habitat - shorter rounded wings, long legs and tail - represent an example of convergent evolution with the Accipiter species.

== Distribution and habitat ==
The species is commonly found in many Central and South American countries: Argentina, Belize, Bolivia, Brazil, Colombia, Costa Rica, Ecuador, El Salvador, French Guiana, Guatemala, Guyana, Honduras, Mexico, Nicaragua, Panama, Paraguay, Peru, Suriname and Venezuela. The species is extremely widespread, with a total estimated population between 500,000 and 5 million individuals. Furthermore, they are year-round residents of their Latin American home.

Due to their distinct morphology, the collared forest falcon is able to inhabit a variety of habitats from moister regions such as mangroves, tropical and rain forests to gallery forest and tall second growth. They tend to prefer regions where the undergrowth is relatively dense and where they can move and hunt more easily within it. They range from sea level to 2500 m elevation.

Around ten territorial pairs are estimated to occupy a 100 km^{2} area. However, these estimates are based on radio telemetry of individuals during the breeding season and therefore they may be different in another context.

== Behaviour ==
=== Vocalizations ===
The call of the forest falcon has been described as a distinctive low, almost human-like ow or ahr. During the breeding season, these vocalizations can be heard before sunrise every morning and into the mid-morning. The low-frequency of the sound and the timing at which they tend to communicate makes it possible for them to be heard at great distances in the dense forest canopy. Their calls are thought to delineate territory as breeding pairs will often keep some distance between them.

The most typical call heard from both males and females is an eight-second song consisting of three or four ow or ahr notes. Sometimes, the female may produce a 10-second call consisting of between 10 and 30 more rapid notes increasing in tempo preceding the regular call.

In the beginning, between one and three weeks old, the young make more of a scree sound. However, this changes to single-note ahr calls as they get closer to fledging and some weeks thereafter.

=== Diet ===
The collared forest falcon will catch its prey by first concealing itself in the dense forest canopy before pursuing by flight, or running and hopping along the forest floor. This hunting of animals is thought to be aided by their specialized sense of hearing supported by a more pronounced facial disk, also seen in owls and harriers. Flexible tail feathers are also helpful when going after prey in dense forest areas. Differences were observed in the hunting techniques among individual M. semitorquatus'.

This Micrastur species enjoys a wide variety of prey such as birds, mammals, lizards, snakes and insects. In a study conducted from 1990 to 1992, prey items delivered to the females, nestlings and fledglings were counted and identified to species (if possible). 223 prey items were accounted for, 171 of which were identified. Results showed that the largest proportion of the collared forest falcon's diet consisted of mammals (46.2%). Then, 34.5% were birds, 18.7% reptiles and 0.6% amphibians. Prey ranged from smaller 20 g to very large 2.7-3.2 kg.

Comparisons with the diet of its relative the barred forest falcon (Micrastur ruficollis) showed that the collared forest falcon had a mean prey weight that was 10 times greater. Since the M. semitorquatus is three times larger than M. ruficollis , a comparaison with another larger raptor could prove more interesting in terms of dietary overlap.

=== Reproduction ===
Courtship activities including vocalizations, searching and guarding of nest sites, prey exchanges and copulation occur during the dry season from January to March. Egg laying spans a 30-day period, peaking during the month of March. Next, the incubation period lasts about 46–48 days with the female as the one doing the task. The male meanwhile provides all the food for this period. On average the young fledge at 50 days old (after hatching). Moreover, they stay dependent on their parents for an additional 6–11 weeks. It is late into the nestling period before the mother is able to leave the nest to go hunt and the father is no longer the sole provider of food for the family. In addition, there have been some accounts of a collared forest falcon feeding fledglings that are not his own. Little is known on why this would occur and/or how often this type of behavior is exhibited.

==== Nests ====
Collared forest falcons use the cavities of large trees and wood debris as their nests. All are non-excavated nesting sites, occurring naturally through decay or broken limbs. Nothing extra is brought into the nest as bedding or support. The entrances and nests themselves are quite large to accommodate for the size of the female birds. Furthermore, larger trees (dbh: 90 cm - 314 cm) are favored for that same reason. In this regard, Spanish cedar (Cedrela mexicana) seemed to be selected more often, in other words there was a positive selection for this species. Other species of trees observed to be used as nesting sites includes: Honduras mahogany (Swietenia macrophylla), Black Cabbage-bark (Lonchocarpus castilloi), Yellow Mombin (Spondias mombin) and Chicozapote (Manilkara zapota). Nesting in live trees proved highly more successful than in dead trees, which were mostly unsuccessful. Most breeding pairs will use the same nest site in subsequent years.

==== Egg and clutch size ====
The eggs of the collared forest falcon are a dark reddish brown with spots found to be either tan or dark brown. Clutch sizes are small, consisting of only 2 eggs. Mass of the eggs are an average of 53.4 g (+/- 2.6 g).

== Conservation ==
Currently, M. semitorquatus ranks as least concern in conservation status since it inhabits a wide variety of forest types. On the other hand, the collared forest falcon tends to select bigger, old growth trees such as the Cedrela mexicana as their nesting sites. This type of wood also happens to be preferred by the surrounding logging industries. Future research may want to look into the potential impact that logging could have on the breeding of these large birds. Modified habitats may prove unsuitable for these species to adapt.
