= Thegornis =

Thegornis Temporal range: early Miocene

Scientific classification
- Kingdom: Animalia
- Phylum: Chordata
- Class: Aves
- Order: Falconiformes
- Family: Falconidae
- Subfamily: Herpetotherinae
- Genus: †Thegornis; Ameghino, 1895

Type species
- †Thegornis musculosus Ameghino, 1895

Other species
- †T. debilis Ameghino, 1895; †T. spivacowi Agnolín, 2022; †T. sosae Agnolín, 2023

Synonyms
- Noriegavis Agnolín, 2009

Extinct genus of birds

Thegornis is an extinct genus of herpetotherine falconid that lived during the Miocene of South America. The genus was erected by Florentino Ameghino in 1895 based on two species, T. musculosus and T. debilis. However, T. debilis was later suggested to be an invalid species, with the differences between it and T. musculosus being due to sexual dimorphism. Two additional species, T. spivacowi and T. sosae, were subsequently named in later years by Federico Agnolín. Its skull and postcranial morphology are similar to the laughing falcon and forest falcon, which together form the clade Herpetotherinae.

The holotype specimen of Noriegavis (originally Cariama) santacrucensis was initially regarded as belonging to a unique seriema taxon, to which a second partial skeleton was referred in 2013. However, later study of these fossils indicated the holotype instead belongs to Thegornis, while the second specimen was given a new scientific name, Miocariama.
