= Buckley's forest falcon =

Conservation status
- Least Concern (IUCN 3.1)
- CITES Appendix II (CITES)

Scientific classification
- Kingdom: Animalia
- Phylum: Chordata
- Class: Aves
- Order: Falconiformes
- Family: Falconidae
- Genus: Micrastur
- Species: M. buckleyi

Binomial name
- Micrastur buckleyi Swann, 1919

Species of bird

Buckley's forest falcon (Micrastur buckleyi), also called lesser collared forest-falcon and Traylor's forest-falcon, is a species of bird of prey in subfamily Herpetotherinae of family Falconidae, the falcons and caracaras. It is found in Bolivia, Brazil, Ecuador, Peru, and possibly Colombia and Venezuela.

== Taxonomy and systematics ==
Buckley's forest falcon was previously considered to be a variant of the collared forest falcon (M. semitorquatus). The two of them and the slaty-backed forest falcon (M. mirandollei) are sister species. It is monotypic.

== Description ==
Buckley's forest falcon is 41 to 51 cm (16 to 20 in) long. Its wingspan is 61 to 72 cm (24 to 28 in). Adult males have black upperparts with a white collar. Their cheeks, throat, and underparts are white and unmarked. Their tail is black with three narrow white bars on the inner feathers and four on the outer ones. Their iris is dark brown, their cere, lores, and bare skin around the eye are dull greenish, and their legs and feet are yellowish. Adult females are like males with the addition of white spots on their scapulars and secondaries. Juveniles are also black above but have a buffy breast and dark bars on the belly.

== Distribution and habitat ==
Buckley's forest falcon is known from only a few specimens, photographs, and sightings. It has been documented in Bolivia, extreme western Brazil, eastern Ecuador, and eastern Peru. A few sight records in Colombia and Venezuela lead the South American Classification Committee of the American Ornithological Society to classify it as hypothetical in those two countries. Most of the records are from lowland tropical and subtropical forest at elevations between 100 and 700 m (300 and 2,300 ft) but one specimen was collected at 1,800 m (5,900 ft) in Ecuador and there is a record at 1,350 m (4,400 ft) in Peru.

== Behavior ==
=== Movement ===
Buckley's forest falcon is assumed to be a year-round resident.

=== Feeding ===
Almost nothing is known about the diet or hunting technique of Buckley's forest falcon. One specimen had a small Mesomys arboreal rat in its stomach. The species' small feet suggest that birds are only a minor part of its diet.

=== Breeding ===
Sightings of Buckley's forest falcon fledglings suggest that its breeding season includes April to early August. Nothing else is known about its breeding biology though it is assumed to nest in tree cavities like other Micrastur forest falcons.

=== Vocalization ===
The most common Buckley's forest falcon vocalization is "a far-carrying, nasal "eeok, oow" or "eeok, oow...ow", repeated...for long periods, mainly at dawn." It also occasionally makes "a long rising series of "kaw" notes followed by 2-3 falling "aauw" notes".

== Status ==
The IUCN has assessed Buckley's forest falcon as being of Least Concern, though it has a limited range and an unknown population size that is believed to be decreasing. No immediate threats have been identified. It is poorly known and considered to be rare. "Evidence suggest that species is not immediately threatened; however, at least in part of range, habitat is in process of being cleared."
