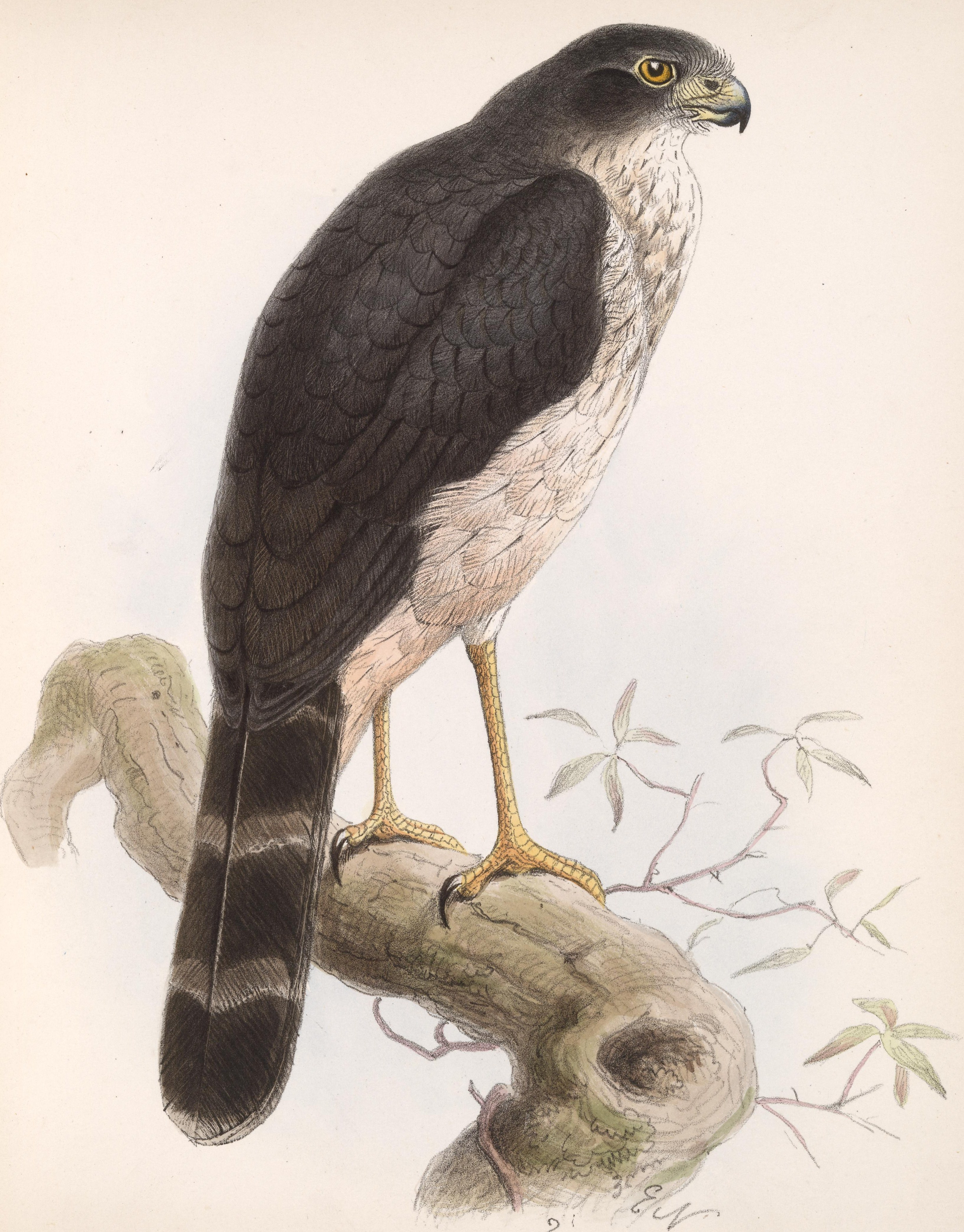

Conservation status
- Least Concern (IUCN 3.1)

Scientific classification
- Kingdom: Animalia
- Phylum: Chordata
- Class: Aves
- Order: Falconiformes
- Family: Falconidae
- Genus: Micrastur
- Species: M. mirandollei

Binomial name
- Micrastur mirandollei (Schlegel, 1862)

= Slaty-backed forest falcon =

Species of bird

The slaty-backed forest falcon (Micrastur mirandollei) is a species of bird of prey in subfamily Herpetotherinae of family Falconidae, the falcons, and caracaras. It is found in Costa Rica, Panama, and every mainland South American country except Argentina, Chile, Paraguay, and Uruguay.

== Taxonomy and systematics ==
The slaty-backed, collared, and Buckley's forest falcons are sister species. The slaty-backed forest falcon is monotypic. The population in Central America and western Colombia and Ecuador, has at times been treated as the subspecies M. m. extimus, but this separation has not been widely recognized.

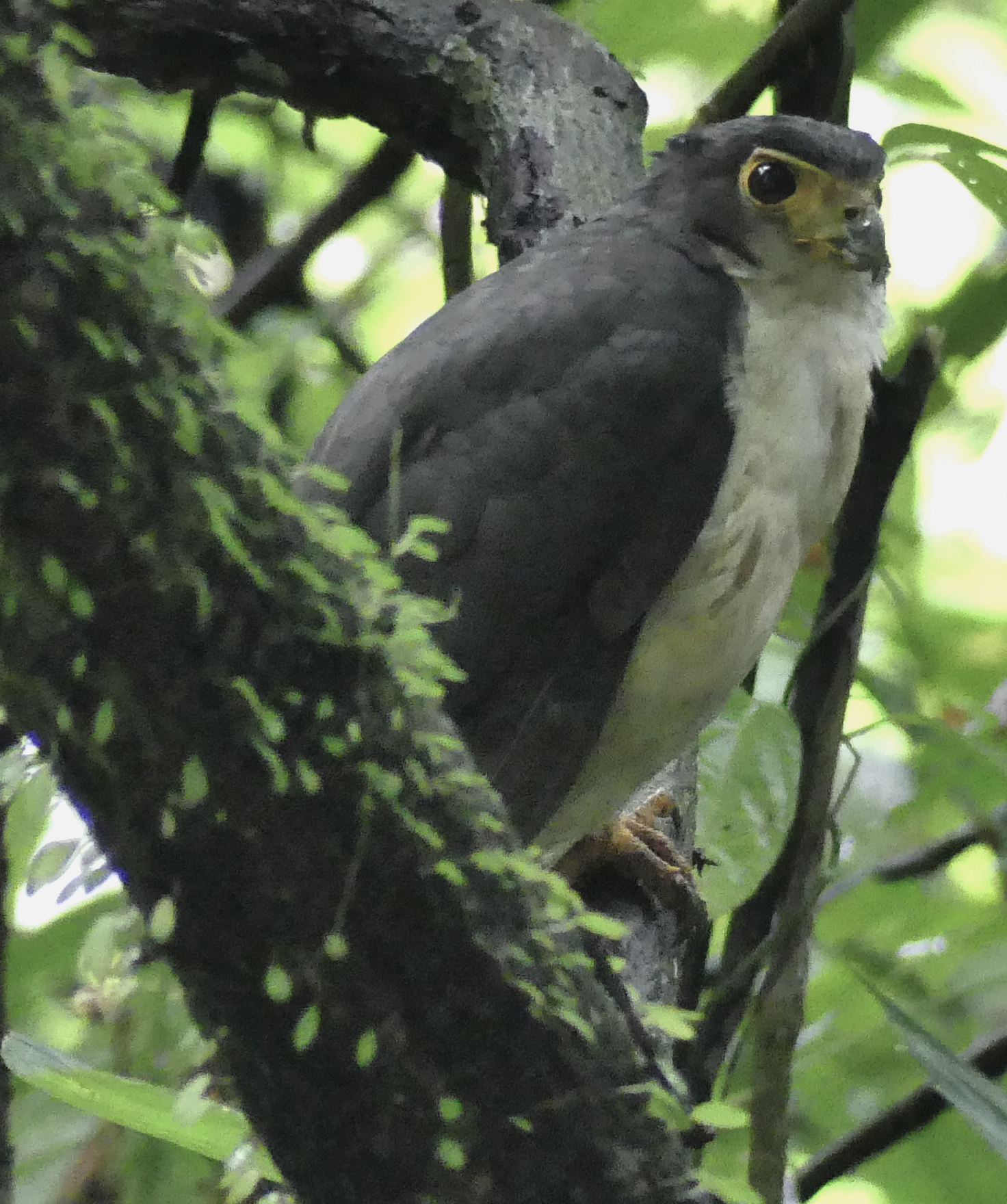
A slaty-backed forest falcon in Costa Rica.

== Description ==
The slaty-backed forest falcon is 40 to 45 cm (16 to 18 in) long. Males weigh about 420 g (15 oz) and females about 500 to 556 g (18 to 20 oz). Its wingspan is 65 to 71 cm (26 to 28 in). Adults have slate gray upperparts, and are darker on the crown and lighter on the cheeks. Their throats and underparts are white to cream, and plain but for a few dark feather shafts making streaks. Their tail is dark slate gray with a white tip and three narrow white bars that often are indistinct. Their iris is yellowish brown to dark brown, its cere greenish yellow, and its legs and feet bright yellow. Juveniles have dark brownish gray upperparts and off-white to yellowish buff underparts with a scaly appearance.

== Distribution and habitat ==
The slaty-backed forest falcon is found from Costa Rica through Panama and western Colombia into western Ecuador's Esmeraldas Province. A separate, much larger, range is found in the Amazon Basin from eastern Colombia, eastern Ecuador, eastern Peru, and northern Bolivia east through Venezuela, the Guianas, and northern Brazil to the Atlantic coast. It mostly inhabits lowland rainforest, favoring undisturbed areas, but also occurs in mature secondary forest and sometimes in rather open landscapes. It is often found near watercourses. In elevation it occurs as high as 500 m (1,600 ft) but is mostly below 200 m (700 ft).

== Behavior ==
=== Movement ===
As far as is known the slaty-backed forest falcon is a year-round resident throughout its range.

=== Feeding ===
The slaty-backed forest falcon's diet has not been detailed but is known to include birds, lizards, and snakes. It mostly hunts from the understorey to the forest's mid level but will go to the ground. It might follow army ant swarms to capture smaller birds feeding on what flees the ants.

=== Breeding ===
Nothing is known about the slaty-backed forest falcon's breeding biology. It is assumed to nest in tree cavities like other Micrastur forest falcons.

=== Vocalization ===
The slaty-backed forest falcon's primary vocalization is a "chanting series of 8-13 nasal, shouting kiiih or kaaah notes". It also makes a "high-pitched eek-eek-eek...", apparently to provoke small passerines to mob it so it can catch one.

== Status ==
The IUCN has assessed the slaty-backed forest falcon as being of Least Concern. It has a very large range and an estimated population of at least 50,000 mature individuals, though the latter is believed to be decreasing. No immediate threats have been identified. It is "[w]idely distributed, but everywhere rare and perhaps patchily present".
