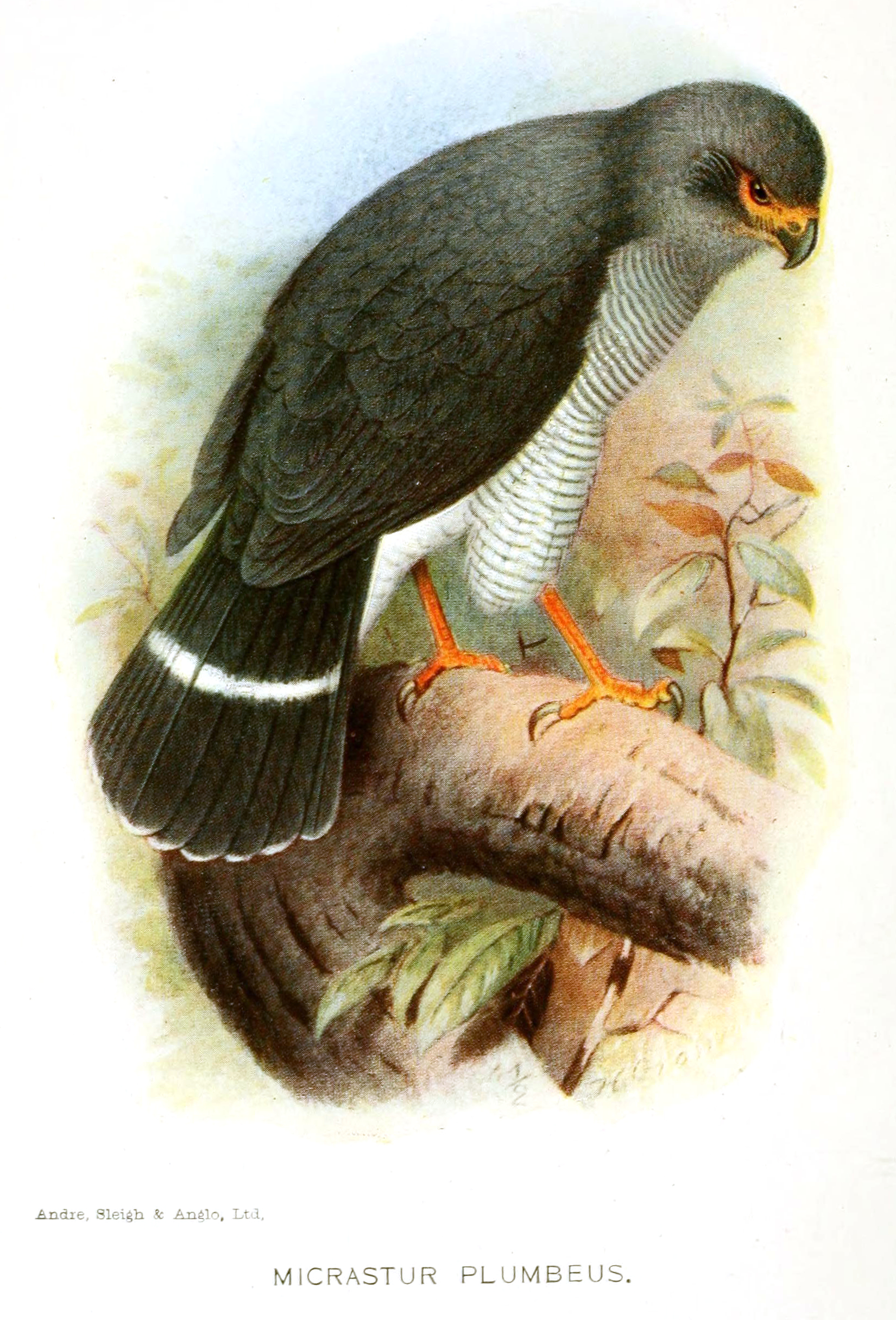

Conservation status
- Vulnerable (IUCN 3.1)

Scientific classification
- Kingdom: Animalia
- Phylum: Chordata
- Class: Aves
- Order: Falconiformes
- Family: Falconidae
- Genus: Micrastur
- Species: M. plumbeus

Binomial name
- Micrastur plumbeus Sclater, WL, 1918

= Plumbeous forest falcon =

Species of bird

The plumbeous forest-falcon (Micrastur plumbeus) is a bird of prey in the family Falconidae only found in the Chocó region in Colombia and Ecuador. This rare bird has not been often spotted, which makes its study complicated. For a long time, it was considered to be part of the lined forest-falcons but it now known to be a species of its own. It is currently considered a vulnerable species because of the precarity of its habitat that is threatened by deforestation.

== Description ==
The adult plumbeous forest-falcon has a grey back and a grey head with very bright orange legs and face. Their breast is barred and paler than their back, and their belly is more whitish towards the tail. This raptor has a black tail with a white tip and a white band in the middle, going across the whole width. Their irides are dark brown. The individuals are 30-34 cm (13 in) long and females are bigger than males. As a matter of fact, females weigh 180-213g and males weigh 172-188g.

Immature individuals look similar besides a whiter breast and beige-ish irides, clearer than in mature individuals.

Forest-falcons usually have long tails and round wings, but the plumbeous forest-falcon has a shorter tail and long wings.

== Taxonomy ==
For some time, it had been debated whether the plumbeous forest-falcon was a lined forest-falcon (Micrastur gilvicollis) or a subspecies of the latter because of their resemblance. As it turned out, these birds were two different species. Their territorial distributions are completely separate.

M. plumbeus and M. ruficollis interstes live in the same environment but do not interbreed, or even interfere with each other. They are sympatric and syntonic. The plumbeous forest-falcon differentiated about 3 million years ago after the split between trans- and cis-Andean South American populations. The closure of the Panama seaway, due to a drier and cooler climate linked to the formation of ice sheets at higher latitudes, may have highly contributed to the isolation of the plumbeous forest-falcon.

Forest-falcons are part of the sub-family Herpetotherinae. This clade's and Polyborinae's species are usually found in forests and wetlands.

== Habitat and Distribution ==
The plumbeous forest-falcon is endemic to the south of the Chocó region in South America. This region extends in the south-west of Colombia and the north-west of Ecuador. This bird lives all-year long in forest lowlands and foothill forests; it is not a migratory bird. The elevation of its habitat varies from the sea level to approximately 1500m of altitude. One research project studying a few pairs of this species found that their territory extended over 35-40 ha.

=== Conservation status ===
This species has been classified as vulnerable by the IUCN because of habitat loss. Deforestation is touching more territories and the plumbeous forest-falcon's habitat is being destructed. It is an unprotected species that needs to be studied more extensively to help its conservation. Efforts should be focused on the Chocó area where this organism is solely contained.

== Behavior ==
=== Vocalizations ===
Two main types of vocalizations are known for this bird. They produce some yapping kew notes every 1.5 - 2.5s, as well as series of cah cah cah-cah-cah that may be sung by pairs. Three types of calls and songs are known for the forest falcons. The most common one is the "territorial advising song". The plumbeous forest-falcon repeat series of five notes to claim his territory. Furthermore, the "excited cackling call" and the "quacking song" are also heard from Micrastur species, even though less often then the first call. Two members of the same species sometimes sing in a pair.

=== Diet ===
Due to the lack of study, the diet of this forest-falcon is not perfectly known. However, it is most probable that it is an opportunistic predator feeding on small vertebrates and large invertebrates. Land crabs, birds and lizards were found in the digestive system of a few individuals. Its main source of food is thought to be lizards. Moreover, this family of birds prey on forest-dwelling birds and rodents.

They have two principal ways to forage. With the first one, they remain on the ground while running after the prey that they eventually catch with their feet. They keep their tail high when they chase the prey. The second technique consists of being perched about 2m above the ground, looking for sounds and movements in the leaf litter and then jumping on the detected prey.

=== Reproduction ===
The plumbeous forest-falcon's reproduction is not really known but it probably sets up its nests in tree cavities. As a matter of fact, other members of the Micrastur family that have been more studied, such as the collared forest-falcon and the barred forest-falcon, nest in trees.
