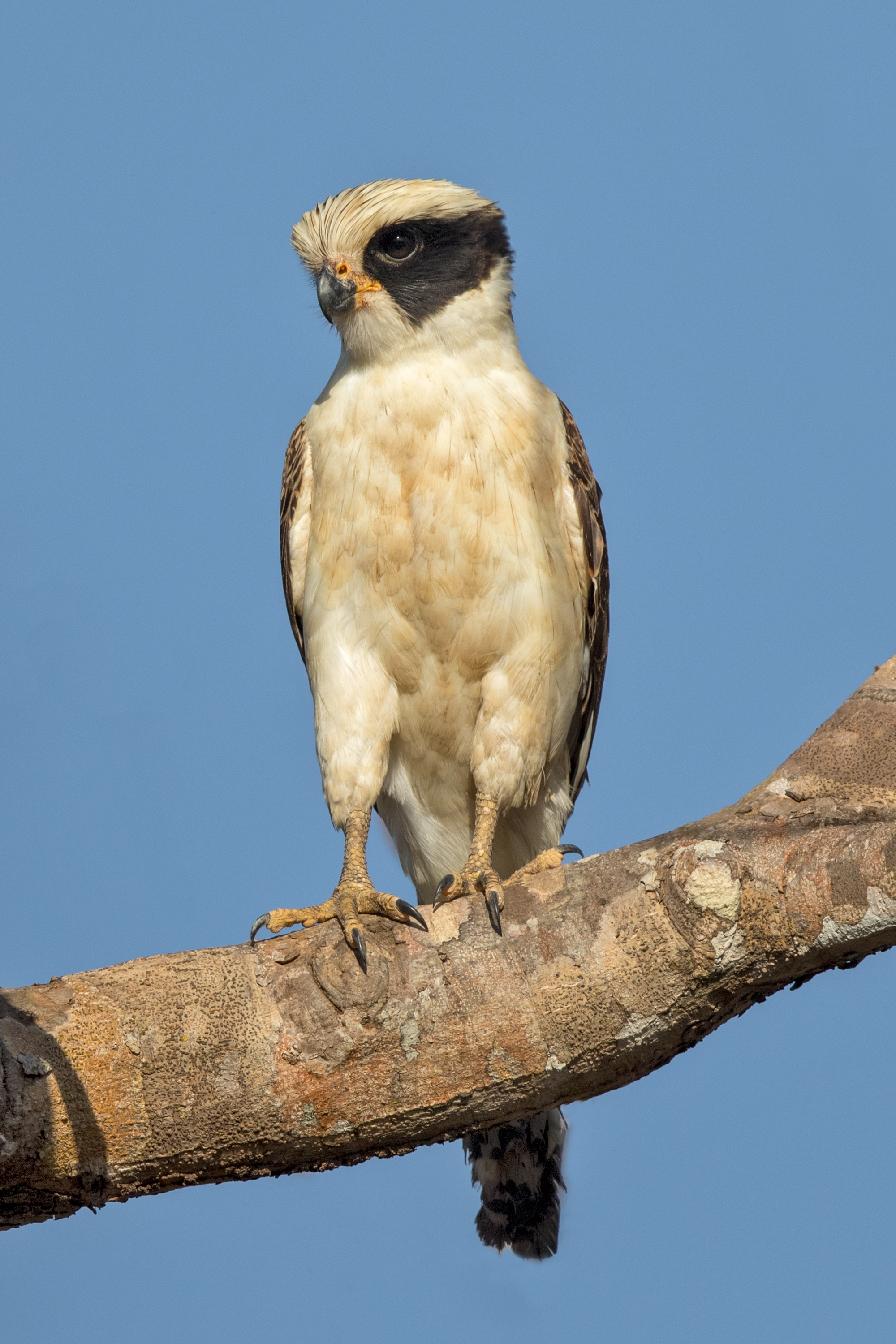

Conservation status
- Least Concern (IUCN 3.1)

Scientific classification
- Kingdom: Animalia
- Phylum: Chordata
- Class: Aves
- Order: Falconiformes
- Family: Falconidae
- Subfamily: Herpetotherinae
- Genus: Herpetotheres; Vieillot, 1817
- Species: H. cachinnans

Binomial name
- Herpetotheres cachinnans (Linnaeus, 1758)

Synonyms
- Falco cachinnans Linnaeus, 1758; Falco sufflator Linnaeus, 1758

= Laughing falcon =

Species of bird

The laughing falcon (Herpetotheres cachinnans) is a medium-sized bird of prey in subfamily Herpetotherinae of family Falconidae, the falcons and caracaras. It is found from Mexico south through Central America and in every mainland South American country except Chile and Uruguay.

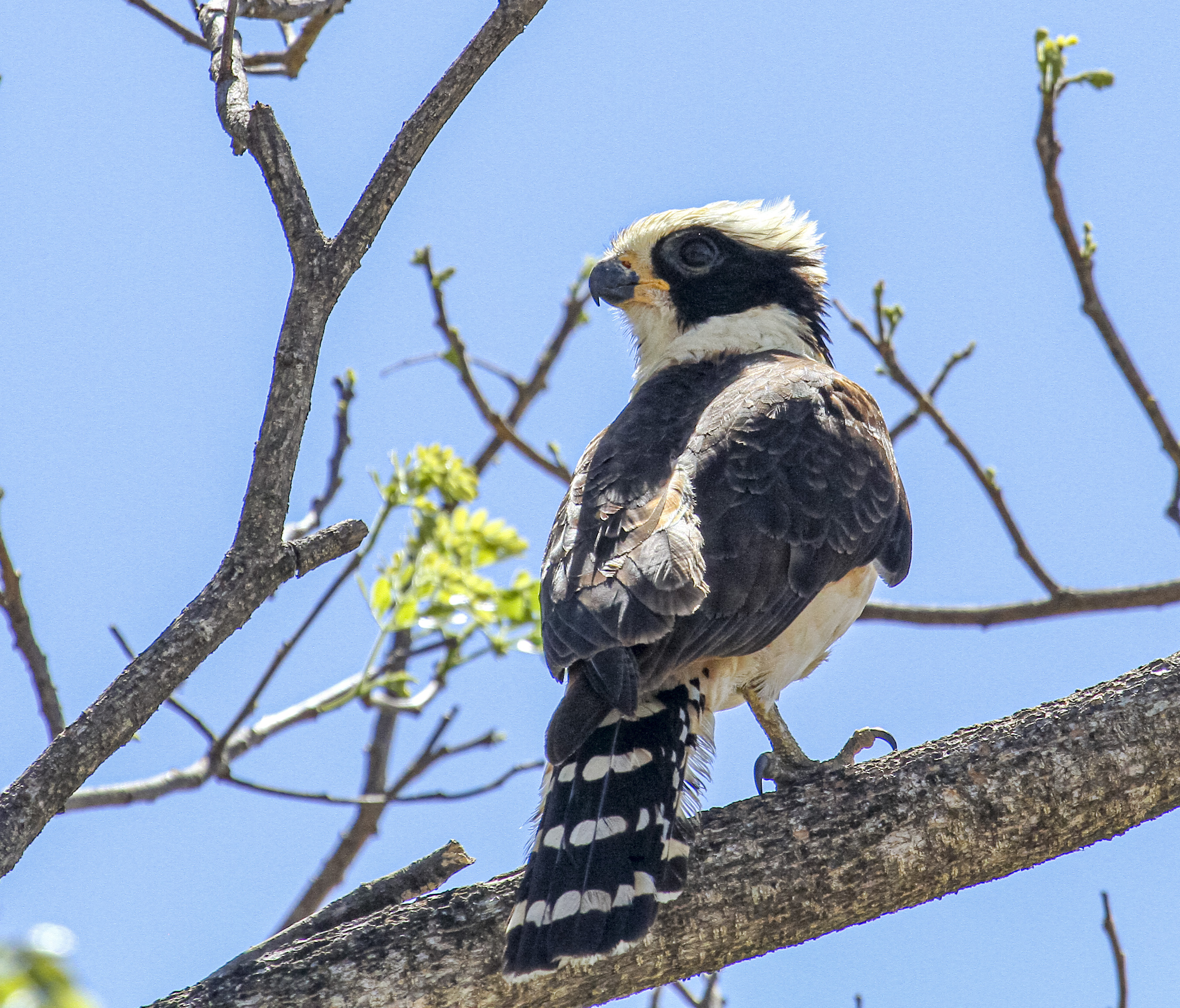
Laughing Falcon, Palo Verde Nat'l. Park, Costa Rica

== Taxonomy and systematics ==
The laughing falcon was formally described in 1758 by the Swedish naturalist Carl Linnaeus in the tenth edition of his Systema Naturae. He placed it with the falcons and eagles in the genus Falco and coined the binomial name Falco cachinnans. Linnaeus based his account on information from one of his students, Daniel Rolander, who had visited the Dutch colony of Surinam in South America. The laughing falcon is now the only species placed in the genus Herpetotheres that was introduced in 1817 by the French ornithologist Louis Vieillot. A 2015 molecular phylogenetic study by Jérôme Fuchs and collaborators found that the laughing falcon was sister to the forest falcons in the genus Micrastur.

Major taxonomic systems place the laughing falcon in the subfamily Herpetotherinae with the forest falcons. Earlier it had been placed in the subfamily Falconinae with the "true" falcons. Though up to six subspecies have been proposed, only two have widespread acceptance: the nominate H. c. cachinnans (Linnaeus, 1758) and H. c. fulvescens (Chapman, 1915).

The laughing falcon's generic name Herpetotheres refers to its preferred food; it is Latinized Ancient Greek, derived from [h]erpeton (ἑρπετόν, "reptile") + therizein (θερίζειν, "to mow down"). Its English name comes from its loud voice, as does the specific epithet cachinnans, Latin for "laughing aloud" or "laughing immoderately".

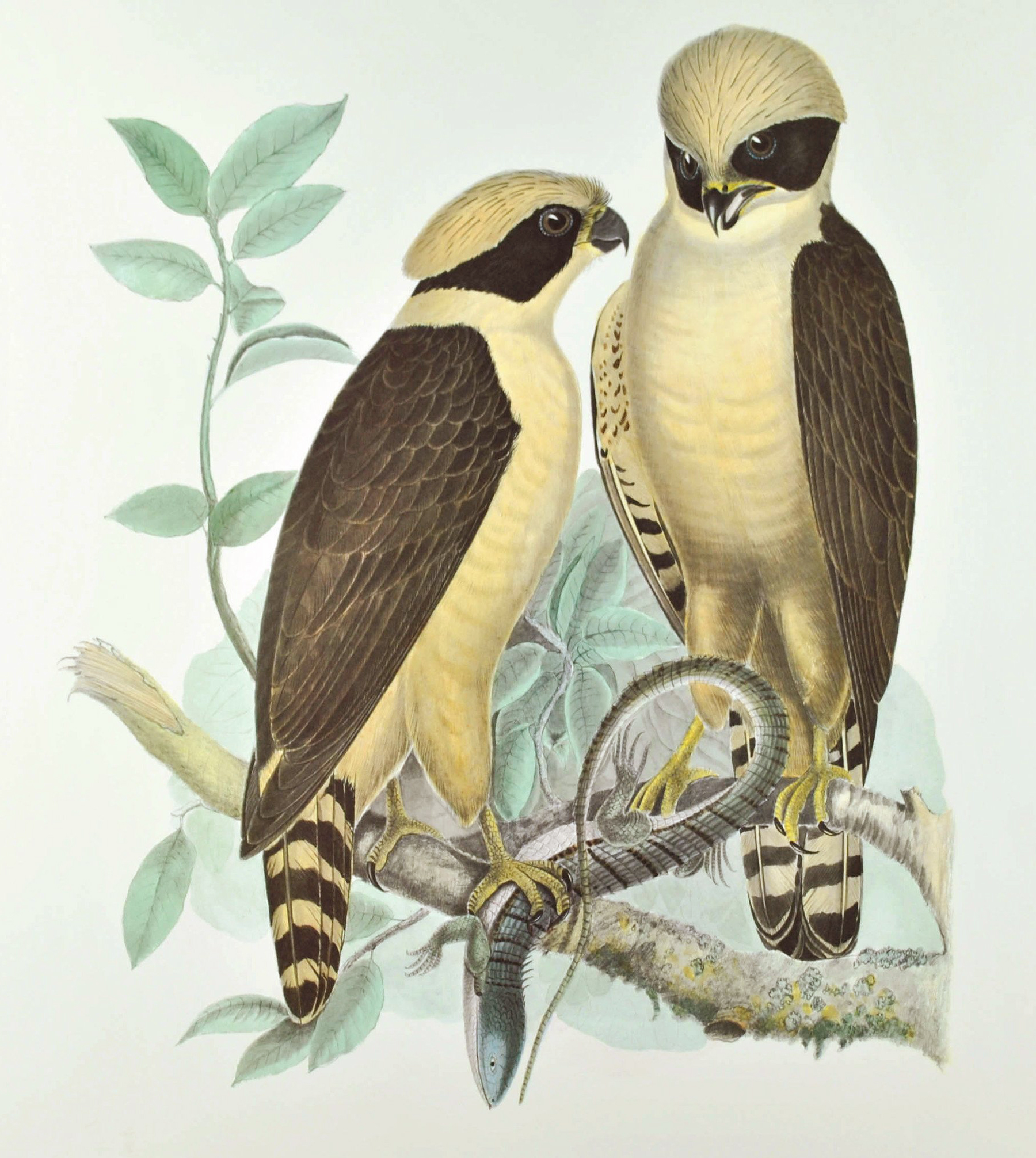
Painting by Andrew Jackson Grayson

== Description ==
The laughing falcon is 45 to 56 cm (18 to 22 in) long and has a wingspan of 79 to 94 cm (31 to 37 in). Females are slightly larger than males and significantly heavier. Males of the nominate subspecies weigh 408 to 686 g (0.9 to 1.5 lb) and females 590 to 800 g (1.3 to 1.8 lb). Subspecies H. c. fulvescens is slightly smaller than the nominate.

The sexes of the laughing falcon have the same plumage. Adults of the nominate subspecies have creamy white underparts that vary somewhat among individuals, seasonally, and with feather wear. They have a broad dusky black face "mask" that continues around the neck as a narrow collar. Their crown has dusky black feather shafts that show as narrow streaks, and the rear of the crown has a small bushy crest. Their wings and back are dusky black. Their tail is also dusky black, with four or five white bands, though some individuals have white spots instead. The uppertail coverts are pale buff to cream. The underside of their wing is pale buff, sometimes with some dusky spotting on the underwing coverts, and the flight feathers have cinnamon rufous bases and darker bars. Their iris is dark brown or hazel, their bill is black with a pale yellow to orange-yellow cere, and their feet are usually dull yellow.

Immature laughing falcons differ little from adults; they have lighter margins to the back feathers, producing a scalloped effect. Some individuals have cinnamon buff or dusky streaks and spots on their underparts.

In flight, the laughing falcon shows a rufous patch at the base of the wing's underside and a shape more like an Accipiter hawk than most of its falcon relatives, with short, rounded wings and a long tail.

Subspecies H. c. fulvescens has the same plumage pattern as the nominate but is darker and richer colored overall; its underside is more cinnamon buff than creamy white.

== Distribution and habitat ==
The nominate subspecies of the laughing falcon is by far the more widespread. It is found from southern Sonora and San Luis Potosi south through Central America, "exiting" through northeastern Panama into northern Colombia. In South America its range continues east through Venezuela, the Guianas, and northern Brazil to the Atlantic Ocean, and to the south, east of the Andes through Ecuador, Peru, Bolivia, and Paraguay into northeastern Argentina, and in most of Brazil. Subspecies H. c. fulvescens is found from Panama's Darién Province south through western Colombia and western Ecuador into northwestern Peru as far as the Department of Lambayeque.

The laughing falcon inhabits a wide variety of semi-open treed landscapes, shunning the interior of dense forests. It is found in primary evergreen and deciduous forests, gallery forests, secondary forests, palm groves, savannas, and other open areas with some trees or forest patches. It is generally a bird of the lowlands, from sea level up. It reaches 1,500 m (4,900 feet) in most of Central America though it occurs locally to 1,850 m (6,100 feet) in Costa Rica. It reaches 2,400 m (7,900 feet) in Colombia but usually is much lower. It occurs mostly below 800 m (2,600 feet) in Ecuador, 1,000 m (3,300 feet) in Peru, and 900 m (3,000 feet) in Bolivia.

== Behavior ==
=== General ===
The laughing falcon's flight is slow, with quick, shallow wingbeats interspersed with glides; the bird rarely, if ever, soars. It flicks its tail up and down when it lands. It frequently perches conspicuously on a branch for hours, sitting upright and observing the ground alertly, sometimes flicking its tail or nodding, or moving around a bit on its perch with slow steps.

=== Movement ===
The laughing falcon is a year-round resident throughout its range.

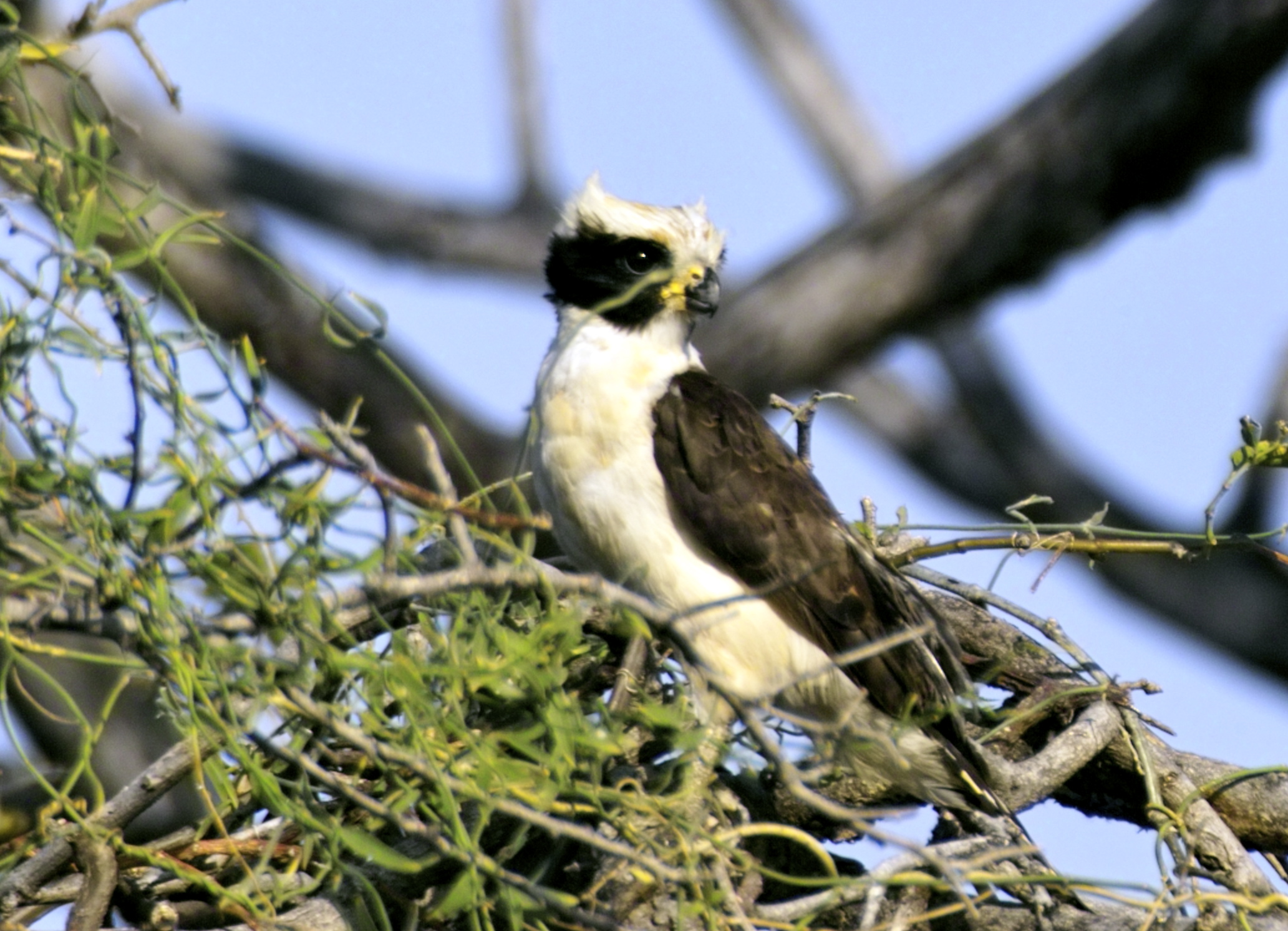
Perched in a tree, looking for prey?

=== Feeding ===
The laughing falcon mainly feeds on snakes, including venomous ones such as coral snakes, and some large ones as well. In secondary forest and other disturbed habitats, it also feeds on lizards, small rodents, bats, and fish; there are a few records of its feeding on birds and centipedes. It usually hunts from a perch, dropping or pouncing on its prey "with an audible thud". It carries the food to a perch to eat, with small snakes in its bill and large ones in one foot. Small prey is swallowed whole and larger items torn apart.

=== Breeding ===
The laughing falcon's breeding season varies geographically. Eggs are laid early in the dry season (February and March) in Guatemala and Costa Rica. Breeding activity has been reported during September (the rainy season) in Venezuela, in January in Argentina, in May in southwestern Colombia, in July in northwestern Peru, and in September in central Brazil. It usually nests in tree cavities as high as 30 m (100 ft) above the ground, but also uses a tree crotch, rock crevices, and abandoned nests of other raptors. It adds little or no material to the site. The clutch is usually one egg but sometimes two. The female alone incubates; the period is about 40 to 45 days and fledging occurs about 55 to 59 days after hatch. Both parents care for the nestlings and fledglings.

=== Vocalization ===
The laughing falcon is highly vocal. Its "advertisement call" is a "long rhythmic far-carrying series of loud hollow notes...often after bubbly laugh at outset, series of wah notes that gradually increase in pitch and loudness...into series of wah'-co phrases." This vocalization has also been described as a song and rendered as "a fairly steady wah wah or w-hah w-hah or ha...ha...ha". Nesting pairs duet, with the female's "au-au-auu" call answered by the male's "wah-koh, wah-koh, wah-koh". "Fully developed duets will often turn into syncopation, which is very important when forming pair bonds."

These vocalizations give rise to common names such as acauã in Brazilian Portuguese and halcón macagua, guaco, halcón guaco, and guaicurú in various Spanish-speaking countries.

== In culture ==
The Ch'ol Maya of Chiapas, Mexico, believe that the laughing falcon can kill venomous snakes because the birds are healers that can cure themselves if they are bitten. Tzotzil healers imitate the call of a laughing falcon in order to cure a snake bite. Some folklore says that the species is capable of predicting rain.

== Status ==
The IUCN has assessed the laughing falcon as being of Least Concern. It has an extremely large range and an estimated population of at least a half million mature individuals, though the latter is believed to be decreasing. No immediate threats have been identified. "Populations are larger in disturbed forests than they [are] in primary forest."
