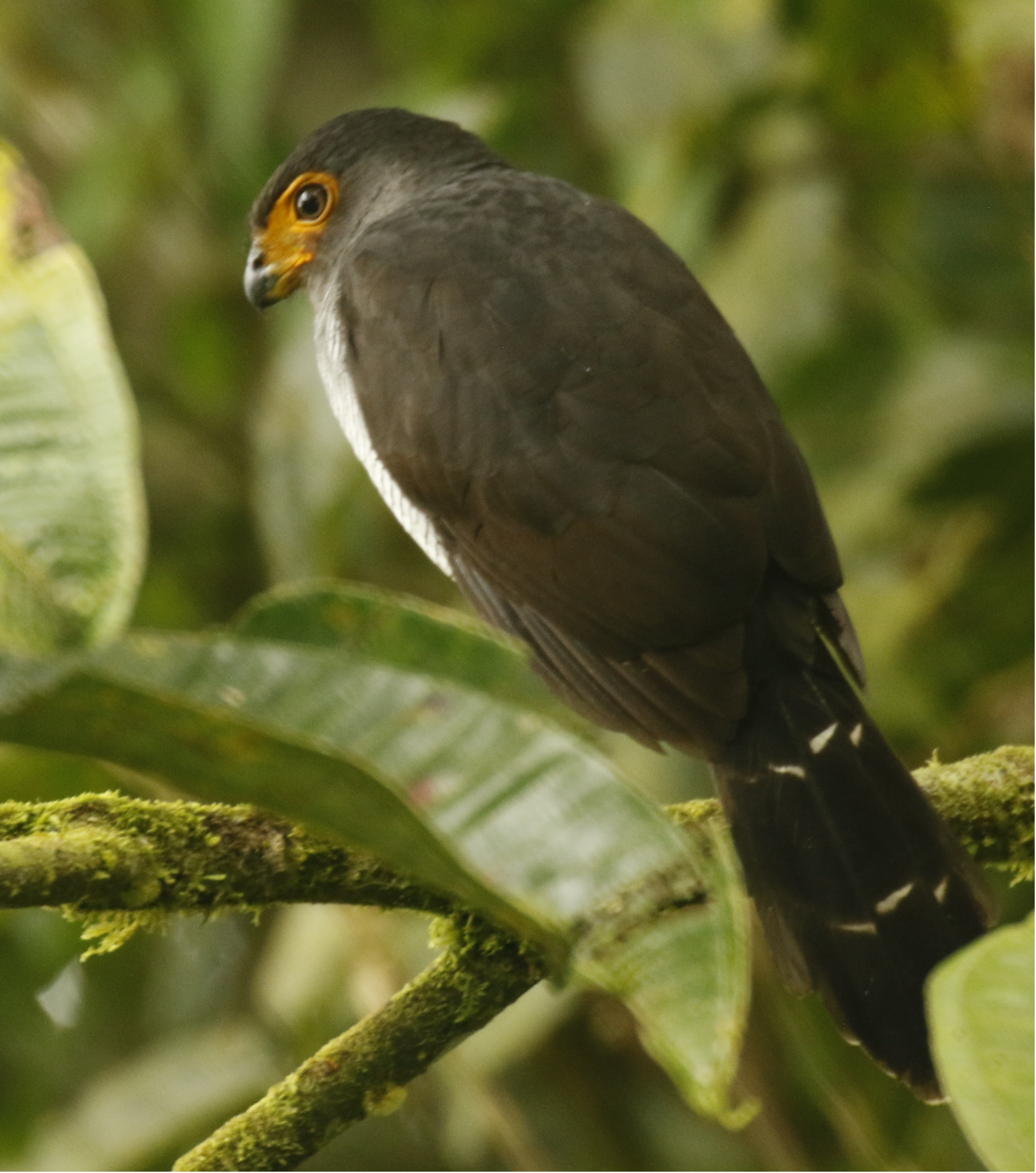
- Immature bird with brown iris and yellow face

Conservation status
- Least Concern (IUCN 3.1)

Scientific classification
- Kingdom: Animalia
- Phylum: Chordata
- Class: Aves
- Order: Falconiformes
- Family: Falconidae
- Genus: Micrastur
- Species: M. gilvicollis

Binomial name
- Micrastur gilvicollis (Vieillot, 1817)

= Lined forest falcon =

Species of bird

The lined forest falcon (Micrastur gilvicollis) is a species of bird of prey in subfamily Herpetotherinae of family Falconidae, the falcons and caracaras. It is found in Bolivia, Brazil, Colombia, Ecuador, French Guiana, Guyana, Peru, Suriname, and Venezuela.

== Taxonomy and systematics ==
Until 1972 what is now the lined forest falcon was considered a subspecies of the barred forest falcon (M. ruficollis); the treatment as a full species was confirmed in 2019. (In the mid-20th century some previous authors had treated it as a species.) What is now the cryptic forest falcon (M. mintoni) was a population of the lined forest falcon until 2002 when vocal studies and specimen analyses determined it was a separate species. The plumbeous forest falcon (M. plumbeus) has sometimes been considered a subspecies of the lined forest falcon.

The lined forest falcon is monotypic.

== Description ==
The lined forest falcon is 33 to 38 cm (13 to 15 in) long and weighs 170 to 262 g (6.0 to 9.2 oz). It has pale gray upperparts. Its white underparts have highly variable gray barring, from light gray only on the breast to heavy bars on the entire underparts. Its tail is dark gray with a white tip and two narrow white bars. Its iris is white surrounded by bare reddish orange skin and its legs and feet are yellow.

== Distribution and habitat ==
The lined forest falcon is found in the Amazon Basin from eastern Colombia, eastern Ecuador, eastern Peru, and northern Bolivia east through Venezuela, the Guianas, and northern Brazil to the Atlantic coast. It mostly inhabits the interior of intact tropical primary forest, though it occurs in lower density in secondary forest and forest edges. In Colombia and Ecuador it prefers terra firme forest. In elevation it ranges from near sea level to 1,600 m (5,200 ft).

== Behavior ==
=== Movement ===
As far as is known the lined forest falcon is a year-round resident throughout its range.

=== Feeding ===
The lined forest falcon hunts mostly in the forest understorey. Its diet has not been described in detail but is known to include lizards, large insects, birds, snakes, and small mammals. It sometimes follows army ant swarms.

=== Breeding ===
Essentially nothing is known about the lined forest falcon's breeding biology. It is probably similar to that of the barred forest falcon, which see here.

=== Vocalization ===
The lined forest falcon's most common vocalization is a series of "nasal "cow-káh", "cow káw-káw" or "cow káw-káw-káw""notes. It typically calls before dawn and during wet weather.

== Status ==
The IUCN has assessed the lined forest falcon as being of Least Concern. It has a large range, but its population size is not known and is believed to be decreasing. No immediate threats have been identified. It is thought to be "the most abundant diurnal raptor over much of lowland forest of Amazonia, where it attains very high densities".
