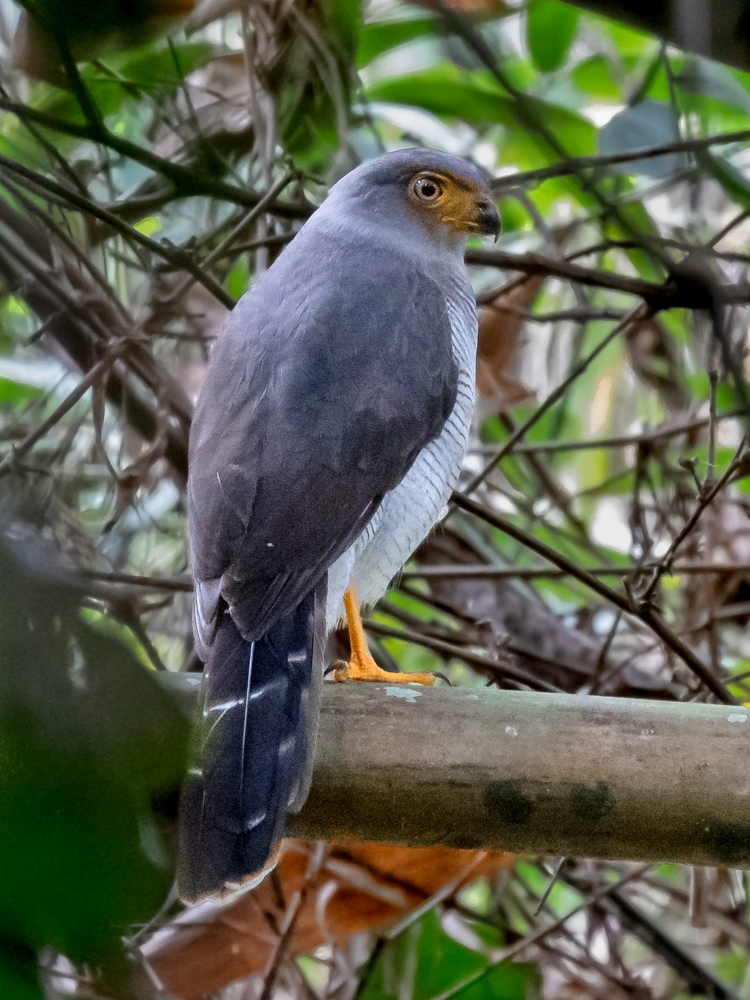

Conservation status
- Least Concern (IUCN 3.1)

Scientific classification
- Kingdom: Animalia
- Phylum: Chordata
- Class: Aves
- Order: Falconiformes
- Family: Falconidae
- Genus: Micrastur
- Species: M. mintoni

Binomial name
- Micrastur mintoni Whittaker, 2003

= Cryptic forest falcon =

Species of bird

The cryptic forest falcon (Micrastur mintoni) is a species of bird of prey in the family Falconidae. It is found in the southeastern Amazon rainforest in Brazil and Bolivia. While uncommon in its Amazonian range, it remains widespread and is therefore rated as least concern by BirdLife International and IUCN. Unlike the lined forest falcon, with which it has long been confused in a cryptic species complex, adult cryptic forest falcons only have a single white tail-band (in addition to a narrow white tail-tip).

== Description ==
The cryptic forest falcon is a rarely spotted bird of prey. When spotted, it is often confused for its congeners, the barred forest falcon, the lined forest falcon, and the plumbeous forest falcon. While it differs slightly from its congeners in its physical characteristics, it is best recognized by its distinctive vocalizations. Its height is 30-35 centimeters, and its weight is 170-264 grams for females (171-238 grams for males). Its plumage is grey (often darker on head), with a blackish upper wing and rump. Its bare red facial skin and single broad white tail bar distinguish it from the barred forest falcon. Immature individuals have two narrower white tail bands. Sometimes, an additional tail band is present, and is covered by the bird's upper tail coverts. With a wing:tail ratio of 1.36, its short tail further distinguishes it from the lined forest falcon. Its chin, central throat, and underparts are white. Its breast is white, with fine dark grey bars (generally bolder in females). These bars are more defined near the birds lower throat/upper breast. This barring is greatly reduced on immature individuals. It has a black beak, with an orange base, and greyish iris. Sometimes a diagonal line across its cheek is present in immature individuals. Its legs are orange, with blackish claws.

=== Sexual dimorphism ===
M. mintoni is lightly sexually dimorphic, with females having a slightly higher weight range, and bolder ventral barring.

== Taxonomy ==
The cryptic forest falcon is a member of the family Falconidae, which includes falcons and caracaras. It is a member of the genus Micrastur, which encompasses all forest-falcons. It is a monotypic species. Specimens were historically labeled as lined forest falcons until the cryptic forest falcon was recognized as a distinct species in 2002. While it closely resembles its congeners, it can be distinguished by its distinctive vocalizations, as well as slight morphological difference.

== Habitat and distribution ==
=== Habitat ===
The cryptic forest falcon primarily inhabits the lowland terra firme forests of South America, a habitat characterized by its tall trees and dense, diverse understory. It also frequents the Várzea forest, a seasonally flooded forest with a bamboo understory. A population also exists in the Atlantic Rainforest of eastern South America.

=== Distribution ===
This species has a wide distribution throughout South America, and is believed to occur over 19,300,000 km^{2}. There are two known populations of the cryptic forest falcon, the first of which is throughout southeastern Amazonia, from north-east Bolivia to Para, Brazil.

A disjunct population, thought to be potentially extinct until its rediscovery in 2012 exists in the Atlantic Rainforest of eastern South America. The status of this population is not currently known, and is likely critical.

== Behavior ==
=== Vocalizations ===
The cryptic forest falcon is most recognizable for its vocalizations, primarily its distinctive song. This song consists of a series of "uk uk uk uk" notes, at one note per second. This song usually lasts for 1-1.5 minutes. This song is used to alert others of its territory. In addition to its song, the forest-falcon has two calls. The first of which, is its cackling call. This call is a series of short "ca ca ca ca-ca-ca notes, with the last three notes closer together, and dropping in pitch throughout. Its quacking call is least often heard, and consists of loud "uuk, qui, qua-qua" notes. The cryptic forest falcon is typically heard at dawn. However occasionally it can be heard later in the morning during dry season. It is less often heard just before dusk.

=== Diet and hunting strategy ===
==== Diet ====
The cryptic forest falcon is believed to be a generalist. It is known to prey on reptiles and invertebrates. It is also believed to prey on small birds, as one individual emerged to a recording of the rufous-necked puffbird.

==== Hunting strategy ====
While little information is known about its hunting strategy, it is believed to be similar to that of its congeners; watching from low perches in the understory, emerging to seize prey.

=== Breeding ===
Very little information is known about the cryptic forest falcon's breeding behavior. It is believed to nest in the wet season (December–May), as it molts remiges from April–August. This is also supported by possible damage from a nesting cavity in a female specimen collected in early June. It is presumed to breed in cavities as do other forest-falcons. M. mintoni has a generation length of 8.6 years.

=== Species density ===
The density of this species is believed to be similar to that of the lined forest falcon, at 1 pair per 20–67 hectares. However, densities as high as 3–4 pairs per kilometer have been reported at dawn during the dry season.

=== Movement ===
The cryptic forest falcon is believed to be sedentary. It is not migratory.

== Threats and conservation status ==
The IUCN classified the cryptic forest falcon as least concern in 2016, which is consistent with its 2004, 2008, 2009, and 2012 assessments. This is largely due to its extremely large range. This range however, is decreasing. An analysis of forest cover change from 2000 to 2012 showed that this species lost 22% of its habitat within three generations, leading some to believe it should be considered globally Near Threatened. While its population size hasn't been quantified, it is believed to be decreasing. This decrease is largely based on its habitat loss due to deforestation. It is suspected to lose 34-51% of its habitat over three generations (26 years).

=== Atlantic rainforest population ===
The population in the Atlantic rainforest was believed to be critical or extinct upon the species classification, due to habitat loss in that region, as well as no specimens being collected after 1933 (originally classified as lined forest falcons, later recognized as cryptic forest falcons). Until 2012, when it was rediscovered in Southern Brazil. Further research is needed to quantify this population and its remaining range in the region. This population is likely critically endangered.

== History ==
Specimens of the cryptic forest falcon were historically categorized as lined forest falcons. It was first recognized as a new species by Andrew Whittaker in 2002 when he heard its distinctive vocalizations. Museum specimens verified that it also slightly differed from other members of the genus in physical characteristics. Whittaker subsequently named the species Micrastur mintoni_{,} in memoriam of shore-bird ornithologist Clive D. T. Minton, Whittaker's mentor.
