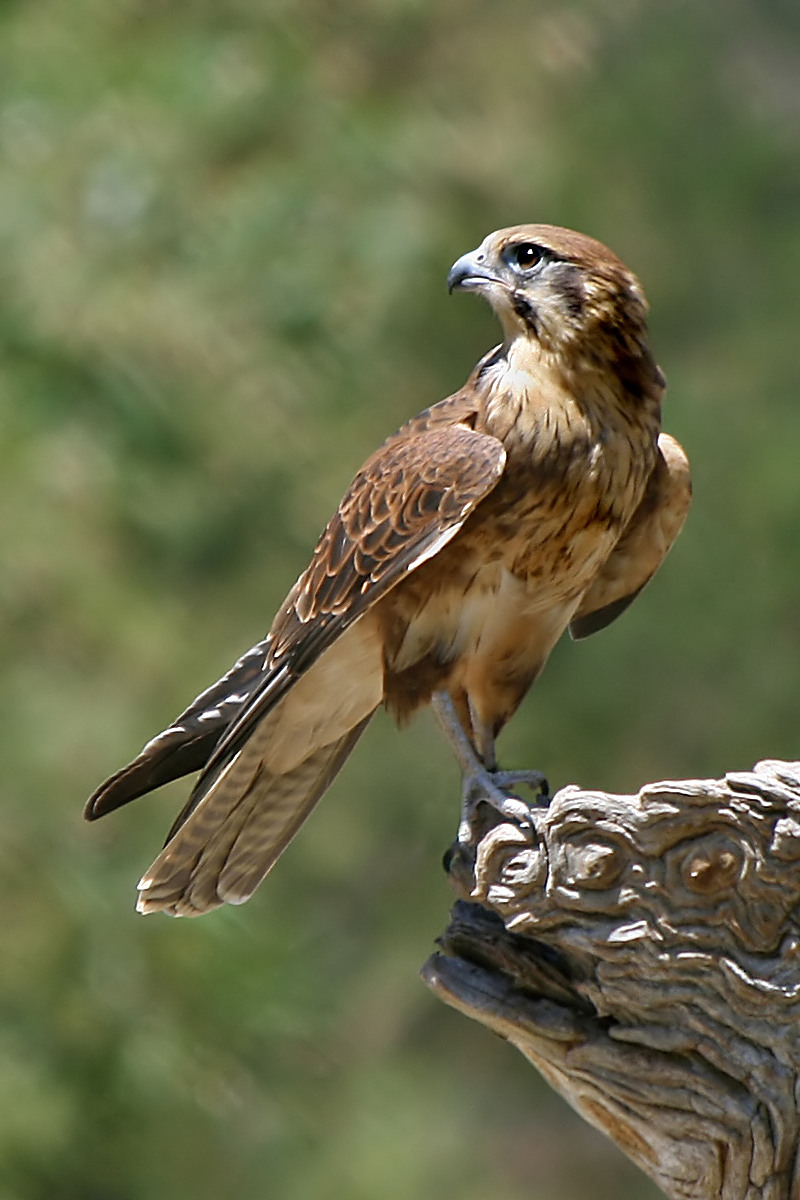
- Brown falcon (Falco berigora)

Scientific classification
- Kingdom: Animalia
- Phylum: Chordata
- Class: Aves
- Order: Falconiformes
- Family: Falconidae; Leach, 1819

Type genus
- Falco Linnaeus, 1758

Subfamilies
- Herpetotherinae; Polyborinae; Falconinae

= Falconidae =

Falcons and caracaras Temporal range: Oligocene – Holocene, 30.2–0 Ma

Family of birds

The falcons and caracaras are around 65 species of diurnal birds of prey that make up the family Falconidae (representing all extant species in the order Falconiformes). The family likely originated in South America during the Paleocene and is divided into three subfamilies: Herpetotherinae, which includes the laughing falcon and the forest falcons; Polyborinae, which includes the spot-winged falconet and the caracaras; and Falconinae, the true falcons, hobbies and kestrels (Falco) and the falconets (Microhierax).

== Description ==
Falcons and caracaras are small to medium-sized birds of prey, ranging in size from the black-thighed falconet, which can weigh as little as 35 grams (1.2 oz), to the gyrfalcon, which can weigh as much as 1,735 grams (61.2 oz). They have strongly hooked bills, sharply curved talons and excellent eyesight. The plumage is usually composed of browns, whites, chestnut, black and grey, often with barring of patterning. There is little difference in the plumage of males and females, although a few species have some sexual dimorphism in boldness of plumage.

== Distribution and habitat ==
The family has a cosmopolitan distribution across the world, absent only from the densest forests of central Africa, some remote oceanic islands, the high Arctic and Antarctica. Some species have exceptionally wide ranges, particularly the cosmopolitan peregrine falcon, which ranges from Greenland to Fiji and has the widest natural breeding distribution of any bird. Other species have more restricted distributions, particularly island endemics like the Mauritius kestrel. Most habitat types are occupied, from tundra to rainforest and deserts, although they are generally more birds of open country and even forest species tend to prefer broken forest and forest edges. Some species, mostly in the genus Falco, are fully migratory, with some species summering in Eurasia and wintering entirely in Africa, other species may be partly migratory. The Amur falcon has one of the longest migrations, moving from East Asia to southern Africa.

== Behaviour ==
=== Diet and feeding ===
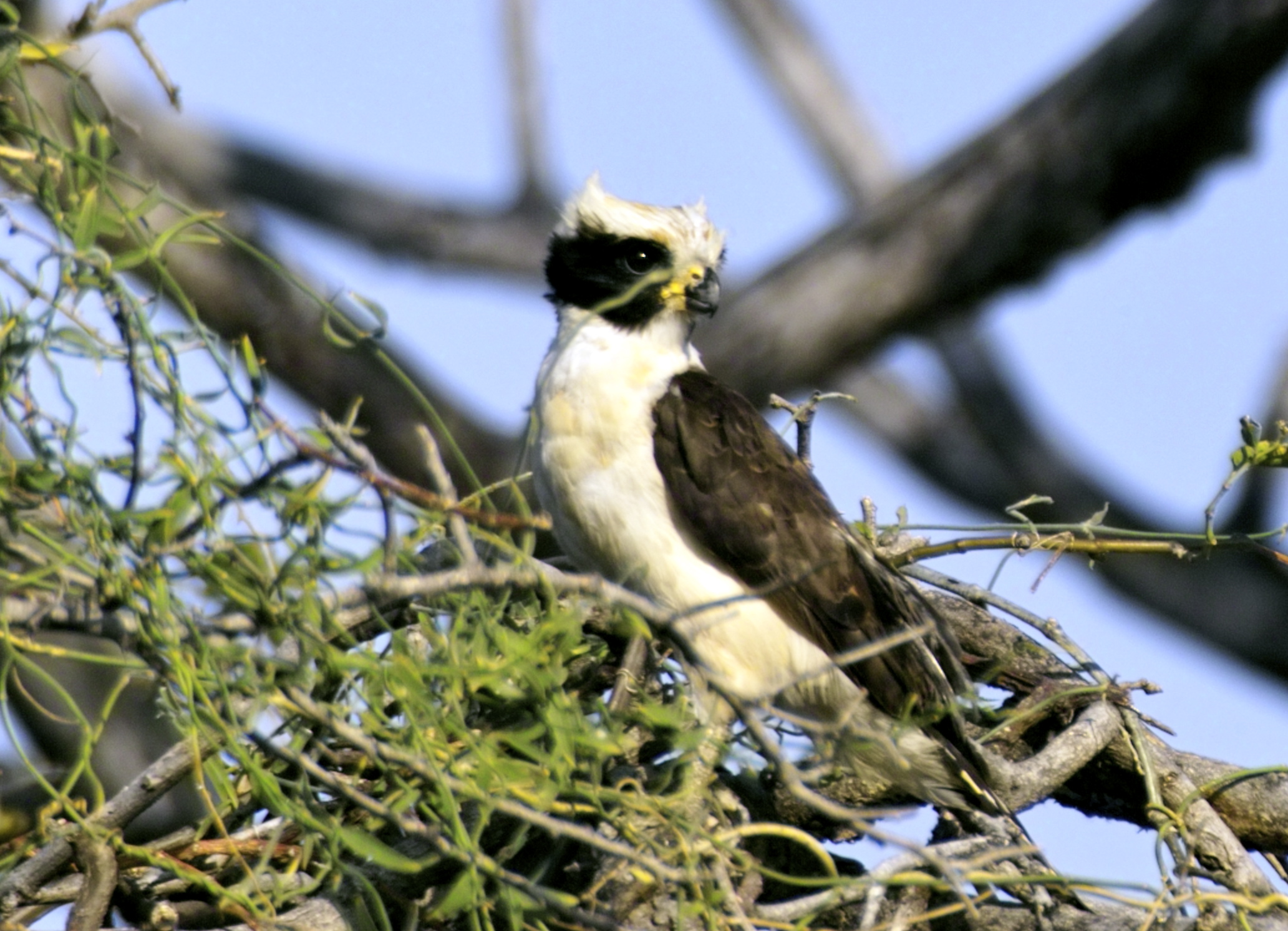
The laughing falcon is a snake-eating specialist

Falcons and caracaras are carnivores, feeding on birds, small mammals including bats, reptiles, insects and carrion. In popular imagination the falconids are fast flying predators, and while this is true of the genus Falco and some falconets, other species, particularly the caracaras, are more sedentary in their feeding. The forest falcons of the Neotropics are generalist forest hunters. Several species, particularly the true falcons, will stash food supplies in caches. They are solitary hunters and pairs guard territories, although they may form large flocks during migration. Some species are specialists, such as the laughing falcon, which specialises in snakes, and the red-throated caracara, which mainly feeds on the larvae of bees and wasps; others are more generalist in their diet.

=== Breeding ===
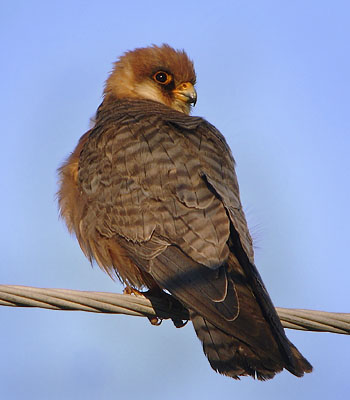
The red-footed falcon is unusual in being a colonial breeding falcon

The falcons and caracaras are generally solitary breeders, although around 10% of species are colonial, for example the red-footed falcon. They are monogamous, although some caracaras may also employ alloparenting strategies, where younger birds help adults (usually their parents) in raising the next brood of chicks. Nests are generally not built (except by the caracaras), but are co opted from other birds, for example pygmy falcons nest in the nests of weavers, or on the ledges on cliffs. Around 2–4 eggs are laid, and mostly incubated by the female. Incubation times vary from species to species and are correlated with body size, lasting 28 days in smaller species and up to 35 days in larger species. Chicks fledge after 28–49 days, again varying with size.

== Relations with humans ==
Falcons and caracaras have a complicated relationship with humans. In ancient Egypt they were deified in the form of Horus, the sky and sun god who was the ancestor of the pharaohs. Caracaras also formed part of the legends of the Aztecs. Falcons were important in the (formerly often royal) sport of falconry. They have also been persecuted for their predation on game and farm animals, and that persecution has led to the extinction of at least one species, the Guadalupe caracara. Several insular species have declined dramatically, none more so than the Mauritius kestrel, which at one time numbered no more than four birds. Around five species of falcon are considered vulnerable to extinction by the IUCN, including the saker falcon.

== Taxonomy and systematics ==
The family Falconidae was introduced by the English zoologist William Elford Leach in a guide to the contents of the British Museum published in 1819. The family is composed of three main branches: the falconets and true falcons, the caracaras, and the forest falcons. Differences exist between authorities in how these are grouped into subfamilies. Also, the placement of the laughing falcon (Herpetotheres) and the spot-winged falconet (Spiziapteryx) varies. One common approach uses two subfamilies Polyborinae and Falconinae. The first contains the caracaras, forest falcons, and laughing falcon. All species in this group are native to the Americas.

The composition of Falconidae is disputed, and Polyborninae is not featured in the American Ornithologists' Union checklists for North and South American birds that are produced by its Classification Committees (NACC and SACC). The Check-list of North American Birds considers the laughing falcon a true falcon (Falconinae) and replaces Polyborinae with Caracarinae and Micrasturinae. On the other hand, the Check-list of South American Birds classifies all caracaras as true falcons and puts the laughing falcon and forest falcons into the subfamily Herpetotherinae.

Falconinae, in its traditional classification, contains the falcons, falconets, and pygmy falcons. Depending on the authority, Falconinae may also include the caracaras and/or the laughing falcon.

=== Phylogeny ===
The following cladogram is based on a comprehensive molecular phylogenetic study of the Falconidae by Jérôme Fuchs and collaborators that was published in 2015. The number of species is taken from the taxonomy published by AviList. Fuchs and collaborators recommended that the genus Daptrius should be expanded to include the genera Phalcoboenus and Milvago due to the shallow genetic divergence. This change has been adopted by the Clements Checklist and by AviList.

- Falconidae
  - Herpetotherinae
    - Herpetotheres – laughing falcon
    - Micrastur – 7 species (forest falcons)
  - - Falconinae
      - - Polihierax – pygmy falcon
        - Microhierax – 5 species (falconets)
      - - Neohierax – white-rumped falcon
        - Falco – 39 species (falcons and kestrels)
    - Polyborinae
      - Spiziapteryx – spot-winged falconet
      - - Caracara – 2 species (caracaras)
        - - Ibycter – red-throated caracara
          - Daptrius – 7 species (caracaras) (includes Phalcoboenus and Milvago)

=== List of genera ===
Below is list of the subfamilies and genera of the Falconidae.

Subfamily	Image	Genus	Species
Herpetotherinae		Micrastur G.R. Gray, 1841 – forest falcons	Barred forest falcon, Micrastur ruficollis; Plumbeous forest falcon, Micrastur plumbeus; Lined forest falcon, Micrastur gilvicollis; Cryptic forest falcon, Micrastur mintoni; Slaty-backed forest falcon, Micrastur mirandollei; Collared forest falcon, Micrastur semitorquatus; Buckley's forest falcon, Micrastur buckleyi
Herpetotherinae		Herpetotheres Vieillot, 1817 – laughing falcon	Laughing falcon, Herpetotheres cachinnans
Polyborinae		Spiziapteryx Kaup, 1852	Spot-winged falconet, Spiziapteryx circumcincta
Polyborinae		Caracara Merrem, 1826	Crested caracara, Caracara plancus; †Guadalupe caracara Caracara lutosa
Polyborinae		Ibycter Vieillot, 1816	Red-throated caracara, Ibycter americanus
Polyborinae		Daptrius Vieillot, 1816	Yellow-headed caracara, Daptrius chimachima; Black caracara, Daptrius ater; Chimango caracara, Daptrius chimango; Carunculated caracara, Daptrius carunculatus; Mountain caracara, Daptrius megalopterus; White-throated caracara, Daptrius albogularis; Striated caracara, Daptrius australis
Falconinae		Microhierax Sharpe, 1874 – typical falconets	Collared falconet, Microhierax caerulescens; Black-thighed falconet, Microhierax fringillarius; White-fronted falconet, Microhierax latifrons; Philippine falconet, Microhierax erythrogenys; Pied falconet, Microhierax melanoleucus
Falconinae		Polihierax Kaup, 1847	Pygmy falcon, Polihierax semitorquatus
Falconinae		Neohierax Swann, 1922	White-rumped falcon, Neohierax insignis
Falconinae		Falco Linnaeus, 1758 – true falcons, hobbies and kestrels	Lesser kestrel, Falco naumanni; Common kestrel, Falco tinnunculus; Rock kestrel, Falco rupicolus; Malagasy kestrel, Falco newtoni; Mauritius kestrel, Falco punctatus; †Reunion kestrel, Falco duboisi; Seychelles kestrel, Falco araeus; Spotted kestrel, Falco moluccensis; Nankeen kestrel or Australian kestrel, Falco cenchroides; American kestrel or "sparrow hawk", Falco sparverius; Greater kestrel, Falco rupicoloides; Fox kestrel, Falco alopex; Grey kestrel, Falco ardosiaceus; Dickinson's kestrel, Falco dickinsoni; Banded kestrel, Falco zoniventris; Red-necked falcon, Falco chicquera; Red-footed falcon, Falco vespertinus; Amur falcon, Falco amurensis; Eleonora's falcon, Falco eleonorae; Sooty falcon, Falco concolor; Aplomado falcon, Falco femoralis; Merlin or "pigeon hawk", Falco columbarius; Bat falcon, Falco rufigularis; Orange-breasted falcon, Falco deiroleucus; Eurasian hobby, Falco subbuteo; African hobby, Falco cuvierii; Oriental hobby, Falco severus; Australian hobby or little falcon, Falco longipennis; New Zealand falcon or karearea, Falco novaeseelandiae; Brown falcon, Falco berigora; Grey falcon, Falco hypoleucos; Black falcon, Falco subniger; Lanner falcon, Falco biarmicus; Laggar falcon, Falco jugger; Saker falcon, Falco cherrug; Gyrfalcon, Falco rusticolus; Prairie falcon, Falco mexicanus; Peregrine falcon or "duck hawk", Falco peregrinus; Taita falcon, Falco fasciinucha

=== Fossil genera ===
- Badiostes (Santa Cruz Early Miocene of Patagonia, Argentina)
- Falconidae gen. et sp. indet. (Early Miocene of Chubut, Argentina)
- Falconidae gen. et sp. indet. (Pinturas Early/Middle Miocene of Argentina)
- Pediohierax (Middle Miocene of Nebraska, US) – formerly Falco ramenta
- Falconidae gen. et sp. indet. (Cerro Bandera Late Miocene of Neuquén, Argentina)
- "Sushkinia" pliocaena (Early Pliocene of Pavlodar, Kazakhstan) – belongs in Falco?
- Thegornis (Miocene of South America)
