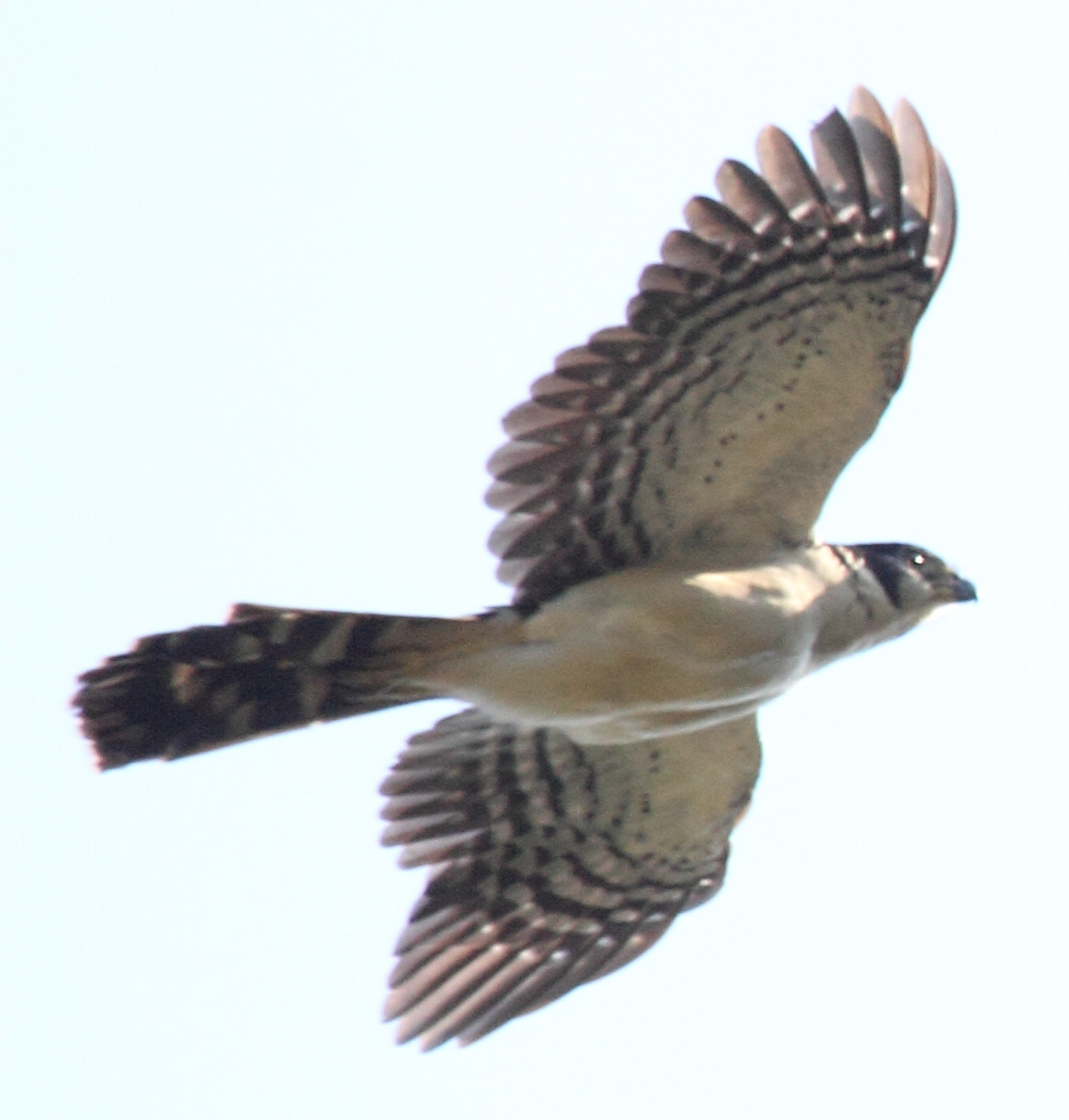
- Collared forest falcon (Micrastur semitorquatus)

Scientific classification
- Kingdom: Animalia
- Phylum: Chordata
- Class: Aves
- Order: Falconiformes
- Family: Falconidae
- Subfamily: Herpetotherinae
- Genus: Micrastur; G.R. Gray, 1841

Type species
- Falco brachypterus Temminck, 1822=Sparvius semitorquatus Vieillot, 1817

Species
- 7 currently recognised: See text

= Forest falcon =

Forest falcons

Genus of birds

Forest falcons are members of the genus Micrastur, part of the family Falconidae. They are endemic to the Americas, found from Mexico in the north, south through Central America and large parts of South America, and as far south as northern Argentina. Most are restricted to humid tropical and subtropical forests, but the two most widespread species, the collared and the barred forest falcon, also range into drier and more open habitats.

Forest falcons, like most Accipiter-type hawks (but unlike other falcons), are adapted for agility in thick cover rather than outright speed in the open air. They have short wings, long tails, and extraordinarily acute hearing. While generally visually inconspicuous, their songs are commonly heard.

Their diet is a mixture of birds, mammals, and reptiles. Hunting is often performed in goshawk fashion: the bird takes up a perch in an inconspicuous position and waits for a prey species to pass, then strikes with a short, rapid pursuit. Forest falcons are inventive, flexible hunters, and at least some species (such as the relatively long-legged collared forest falcon) are also capable of catching terrestrial prey on foot.

== Taxonomy ==
The genus Micrastur was introduced in 1841 by the English zoologist George Gray with Falco brachypterus Temminck, 1822, as the type species. This scientific name is a junior synonym of Sparvius semitorquatus Vieillot, 1817, the collared forest falcon. The name Micrastur combines the Ancient Greek μικρος/mikros meaning "little" or "short" with the genus name Astur that was introduced in 1799 by Bernard Germain de Lacépède for the goshawks.

The English ornithologists Philip Sclater and Osbert Salvin commented in 1869 that "some of the members of the genus Micrastur are at present in a state of great confusion". They listed seven species, of which four are currently recognised and three are considered subspecies.

In 1873, Robert Ridgway noted the similarity of Micrastur to the laughing falcon Herpetotheres. He wrote that "Eight species are given in Gray’s Hand List…, but of this number only five are tenable."

In 2002, a new species was described, found in the Atlantic forest and the southeastern Amazon of Brazil (and later also confirmed for adjacent parts of Bolivia). It has been named Micrastur mintoni, the cryptic forest falcon, as it is phenotypically highly similar to M. gilvicollis.

== Species ==
Image	Scientific name	Common name	Distribution
	Micrastur ruficollis	Barred forest falcon	south-eastern Mexico through Central and South America to southern Brazil, Paraguay, and northern Argentina
	Micrastur plumbeus	Plumbeous forest falcon	Chocó in south-western Colombia and north-western Ecuador.
	Micrastur gilvicollis	Lined forest falcon	western and northern Amazon Basin.
	Micrastur mintoni	Cryptic forest falcon	south-eastern Amazon rainforest in Brazil and Bolivia.
	Micrastur mirandollei	Slaty-backed forest falcon	Bolivia, Brazil, Colombia, Costa Rica, Ecuador, French Guiana, Guyana, Panama, Peru, Suriname, and Venezuela.
	Micrastur semitorquatus	Collared forest falcon	Argentina, Belize, Bolivia, Brazil, Colombia, Costa Rica, Ecuador, El Salvador, French Guiana, Guatemala, Guyana, Honduras, Mexico, Nicaragua, Panama, Paraguay, Peru, Suriname and Venezuela.
	Micrastur buckleyi	Buckley's forest falcon	Peru, Ecuador and far southern Colombia.
