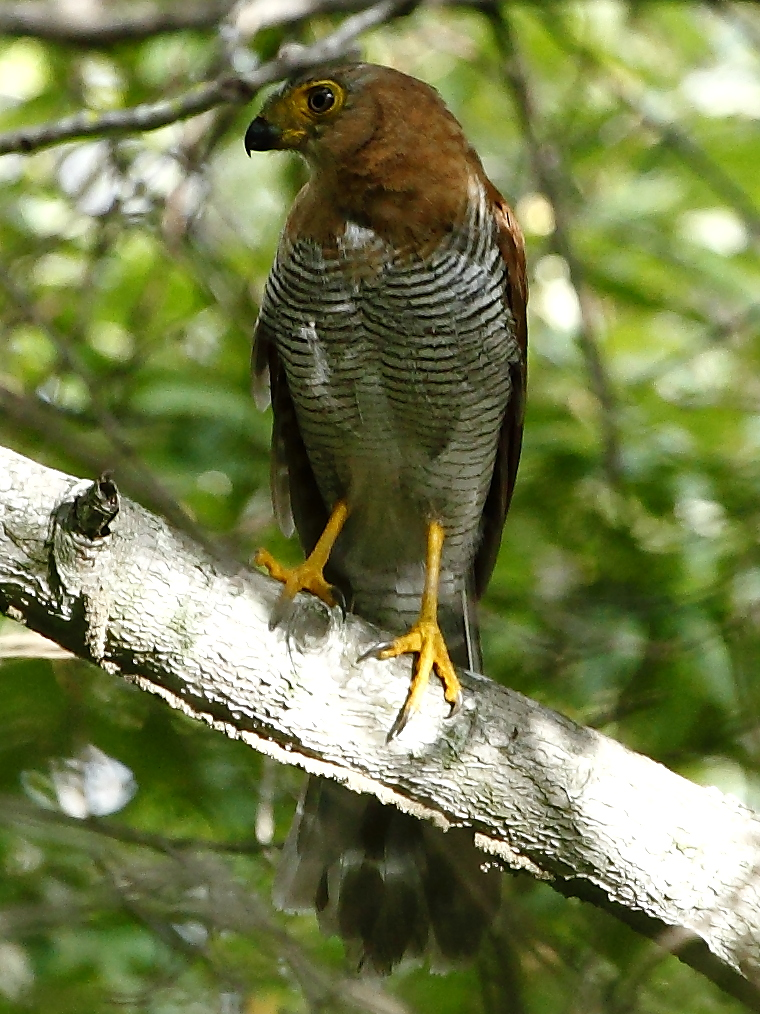
- Rufous morph adult in Ceará, Brazil

Conservation status
- Least Concern (IUCN 3.1)
- CITES Appendix II (CITES)

Scientific classification
- Kingdom: Animalia
- Phylum: Chordata
- Class: Aves
- Order: Falconiformes
- Family: Falconidae
- Genus: Micrastur
- Species: M. ruficollis

Binomial name
- Micrastur ruficollis (Vieillot, 1817)

= Barred forest falcon =

Species of bird

The barred forest falcon (Micrastur ruficollis) is a species of bird of prey in subfamily Herpetotherinae of family Falconidae, the falcons and caracaras. It occurs from southern Mexico south through most of Central America and in every mainland South American country except Chile and Uruguay.

== Taxonomy and systematics ==
The barred forest falcon has these six subspecies:

- M. r. guerilla Cassin, 1849
- M. r. interstes Bangs, 1907
- M. r. zonothorax (Cabanis, 1866)
- M. r. concentricus (Lesson, 1830)
- M. r. ruficollis (Vieillot, 1817)
- M. r. olrogi Amadon, 1964

What is now the lined forest falcon (M. gilvicollis) was previously included as a seventh subspecies.

== Description ==
The barred forest falcon is 31 to 39 cm (12 to 15 in) long. Males weigh 144 to 184 g (5.1 to 6.5 oz) and females 200 to 322 g (7.1 to 11.4 oz). Adults of most subspecies are typically dark slate gray above; the tail is tipped with white and has three to six narrow white bars. The throat is pale gray, shading to the darker slate of the crown. The rest of the under parts, including the under-wing coverts, are white, finely and clearly barred with black or dark gray. The upper breast is a darker gray. The primary remiges are dark brownish-gray with off-white bars on the inner webs. Subspecies, M. r. zonothorax is polymorphic (at least in the northern part of its range), and also occurs in a brown morph, where most of the upperparts, head, and chest are brown or rufous instead of gray. The nominate subspecies M. r. ruficollis appears to only occur in the rufous-brown morphotype, as also suggested by its scientific name, M. r. ruficollis.

The eyes are cream to light orange brown; the bill black, becoming yellow at base of the lower mandible; the cere, lores, and orbit are yellow, and the legs are orange-yellow.

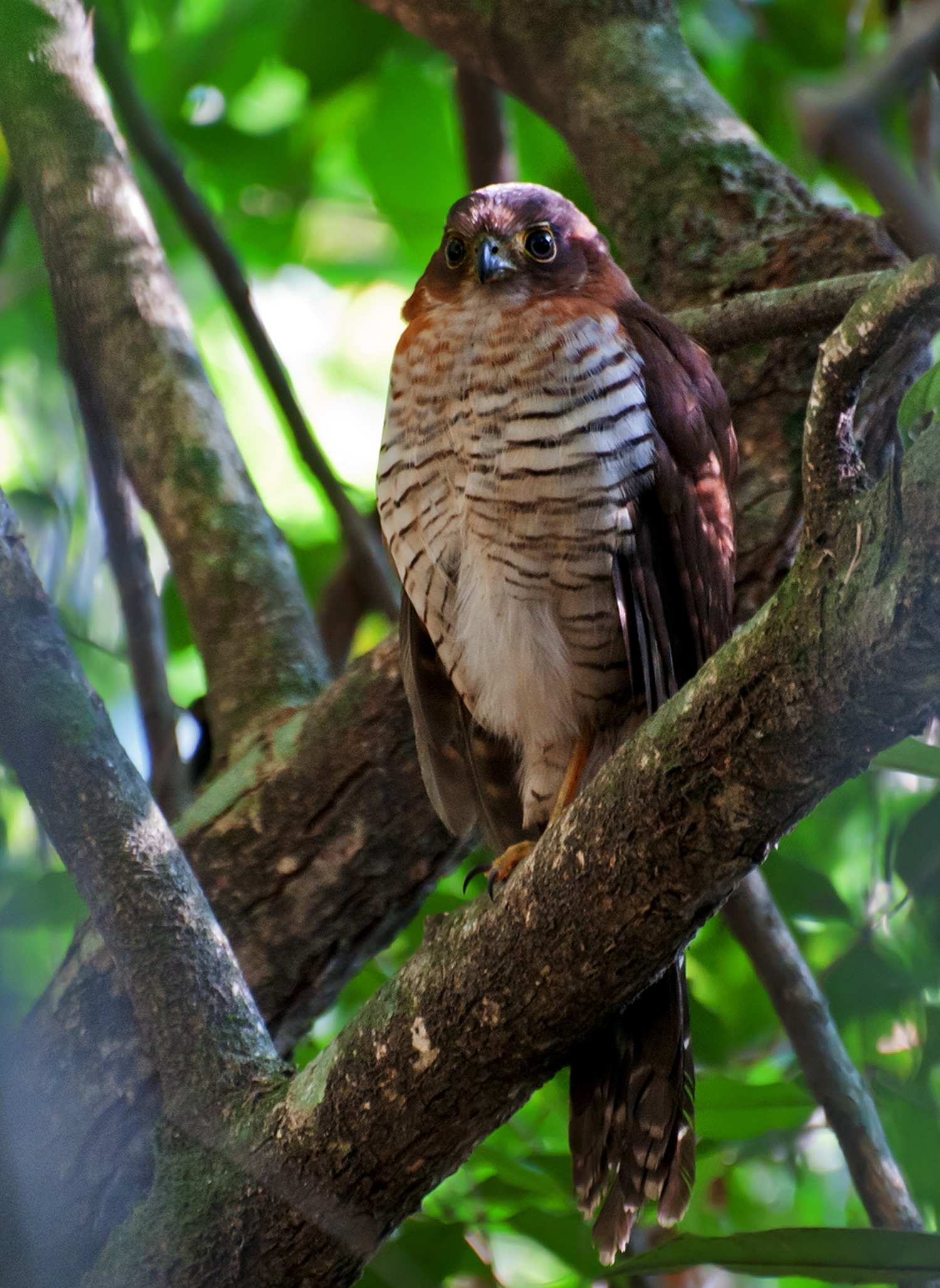
Immature in São Paulo, Brazil

== Distribution and habitat ==
The subspecies of the barred forest falcon are found thus:

- M. r. guerilla, from San Luis Potosí in central Mexico south to Nicaragua, but excluding the Yucatán Peninsula and El Salvador
- M. r. interstes, from Costa Rica south through Panama, western Colombia, and western Ecuador into extreme northwestern Peru
- M. r. zonothorax, the Venezuelan Coastal Range, the Serranía del Perijá on the Venezuela-Colombia border, Colombia's Sierra Nevada de Santa Marta and Cordillera Oriental, and south in the foothills along the east side of the Andes through Ecuador and Peru into Bolivia
- M. r. concentricus, southern Venezuela, the Guianas, and the Amazon Basin of Brazil
- M. r. ruficollis, Brazil south of Amazonia, Paraguay, and Formosa, Chaco, and Misiones provinces of north-central and northeastern Argentina
- M. r. olrogi, Jujuy, Salta and Tucumán provinces of northwestern Argentina

Barred forest falcons mainly use mature upland forest. In Central America, the species is generally restricted to mature tropical forest. In South America, however, the barred forest falcon lives in other kinds of forest and woodland, even relatively arid ones. For example, in the Amazon biome it occurs most often in secondary forest, gallery forest, tidal swamp forest, semideciduous forest, and forest edges. In Acre, Brazil, the barred forest falcon is reported to prefer disturbed forest types, both natural secondary and man-made, including bamboo and more open seasonally drier forest on rocky outcrops, but generally it is a bird that avoids habitat where human influence is too pronounced, and requires primary or mature secondary forest to persist in any location.

The barred forest falcon is rare on the eastern slope of Colombia's Cordillera Oriental, where it was recorded in primary forest and old secondary forest, in a narrow elevational band between 3,300 and 4,900 m (10,800 and 16,100 ft) Second-growth forest in these mountains is dominated by trees like Melastomaceae (e.g. Miconia and Tibouchina) and trees are generally overgrown with epiphytes and hemiepiphytes like Coussapoa (Urticaceae).

== Behavior ==
=== Movement ===
The barred forest falcon is a year-round resident throughout its range but vagrants have been recorded beyond it.

=== Feeding ===
The barred forest falcon feeds on lizards, small birds, mammals (mainly rodents and marsupials such as the Brazilian slender opossum, Marmosops paulensis), bats, snakes, and frogs. Like Accipiter hawks, they often hunt prey by sitting quietly on tree branches and waiting for their victims to appear. When the prey arrives, the forest falcons quickly ambush them, attempting to catch them with a brief, flying pursuit. However, forest falcons also use other techniques to hunt prey, such as chasing prey on foot, following army ant swarms, flushing prey from cover, and nest robbing. The species has also been recorded to snatch animals from traps or cages, for example during mark-recapture studies.

=== Breeding ===
The barred forest falcon's breeding season in Guatemala is from mid-April to early August. The season is not well known elsewhere but includes early June in Amazonian Brazil and October in Colombia. Almost all of the data on its breeding biology were collected in Guatemala during the Peregrine Fund's Maya Project. The species nests in tree cavities, almost always natural ones but sometimes those excavated by woodpeckers. Estimated heights were 10 to 30 m (33 to 98 ft) above the ground. Both nest territory and mate fidelity are high. The clutch size is two to six eggs and the female alone incubates. The incubation period is 33 to 35 days and time to fledging averages 38 days. Both parents provision the nestlings but the male provides about 2/3 of the effort.

=== Vocalization ===
The barred forest falcon's "advertising call" is "a somewhat dog-like, monotonous yapping, "keyak", "ark" or similar". Another call is a "bouncing-ball series..."cah cah cah-cah-cah", or similar". Neighboring males spar when one gives "a rapid, swelling chitter and the other a rapid clucking".

== Status ==
The IUCN has assessed the barred forest falcon as being of Least Concern. It has an extremely large range and an estimated population of at least a half million mature individuals, though the latter is believed to be decreasing. No immediate threats have been identified.
