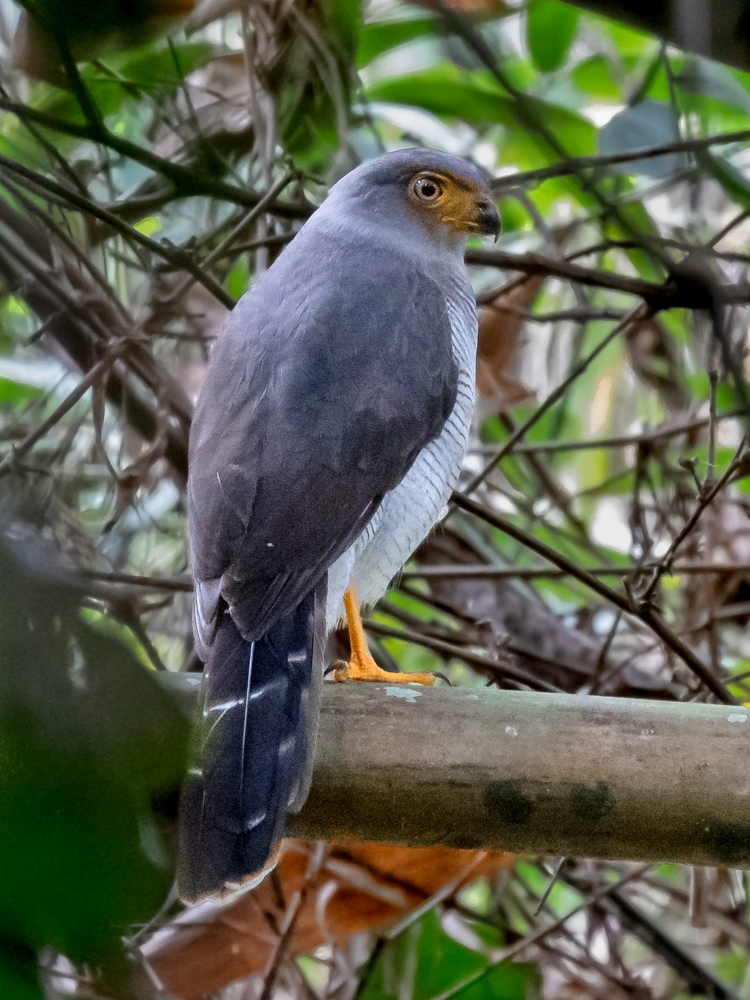
- Cryptic forest falcon, Micrastur mintoni
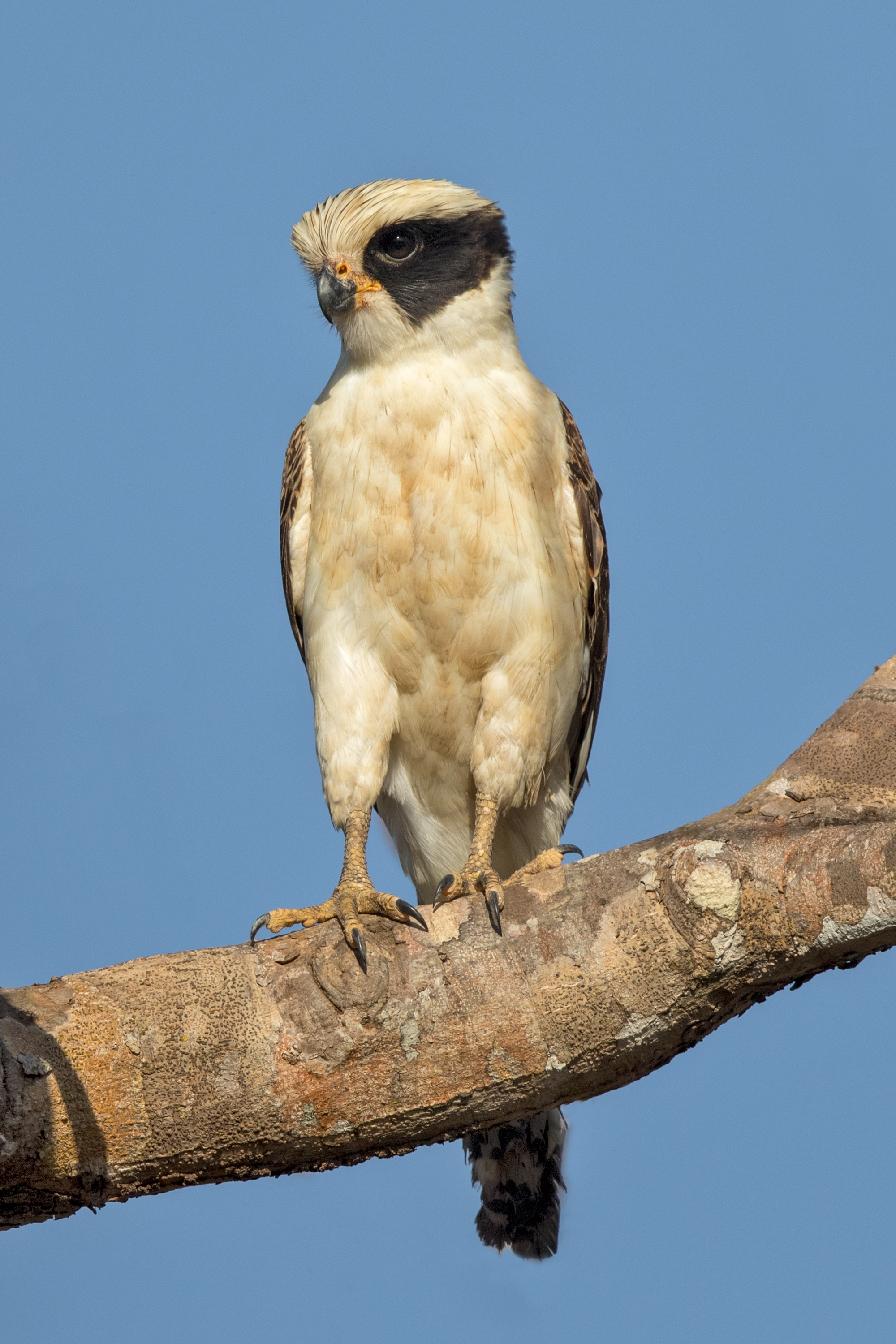
- Laughing falcon, Herpetotheres cachinnans

Scientific classification
- Kingdom: Animalia
- Phylum: Chordata
- Class: Aves
- Order: Falconiformes
- Family: Falconidae
- Subfamily: Herpetotherinae; Lesson, 1843

Genera
- Herpetotheres; Micrastur; †Thegornis

= Herpetotherinae =

Herpetotherinae Temporal range: Oligocene - Holocene, 30.2–0 Ma

Subfamily of birds

Herpetotherinae is a subfamily of falconid birds of prey that includes eight species in two genera Herpetotheres (the laughing falcon) and Micrastur (forest falcons). Both genera are found in South America and the subfamily is basal to the other falconid subfamilies where they split off around 30.2 million years ago in the Oligocene epoch. The two extant herpetotherine genera split around 20 million years ago in the Miocene epoch with the extinct genus Thegornis.
